This is a list of players, both past and current, who appeared at least in one game for the New York Knicks NBA franchise.



Players
Note: Statistics were last updated March 15, 2020.

A to B

|-
|align="left"| || align="center"|G || align="left"|LIU Brooklyn || align="center"|1 || align="center"| || 28 || 220 || 15 || 23 || 43 || 7.9 || 0.5 || 0.8 || 1.5 || align=center|
|-
|align="left"| || align="center"|F/C || align="left"|Baylor || align="center"|1 || align="center"| || 68 || 1,287 || 301 || 68 || 398 || 18.9 || 4.4 || 1.0 || 5.9 || align=center|
|-
|align="left"| || align="center"|G/F || align="left"|UCLA || align="center"|1 || align="center"| || 71 || 2,371 || 266 || 144 || 909 || 33.4 || 3.7 || 2.0 || 12.8 || align=center|
|-
|align="left"| || align="center"|F/C || align="left"|Morehead State || align="center"|1 || align="center"| || 50 || 453 || 120 || 25 || 192 || 9.1 || 2.4 || 0.5 || 3.8 || align=center|
|-
|align="left"| || align="center"|C || align="left"|Kansas || align="center"|2 || align="center"|– || 107 || 1,306 || 467 || 89 || 430 || 12.2 || 4.4 || 0.8 || 4.0 || align=center|
|-
|align="left"bgcolor="#CCFFCC"| x|| align="center"|G || align="left"|Arizona || align="center"|2 || align="center"|–|| 29 || 533 || 60 || 97 || 239 || 18.4 || 2.1 || 3.3 || 8.2 || align=center|
|-
|align="left"| || align="center"|F/C || align="left"|UNLV || align="center"|2 || align="center"|– || 70 || 1,062 || 297 || 77 || 300 || 15.2 || 4.2 || 1.1 || 4.3 || align=center|
|-
|align="left"| || align="center"|G/F || align="left"|Michigan State || align="center"|1 || align="center"| || 33 || 373 || 69 || 29 || 133 || 11.3 || 2.1 || 0.9 || 4.0 || align=center|
|-
|align="left"| || align="center"|F || align="left"|Indiana || align="center"|2 || align="center"|– || 27 || 83 || 31 || 5 || 42 || 3.1 || 1.1 || 0.2 || 1.6 || align=center|
|-
|align="left"| || align="center"|G/F || align="left"|Georgia || align="center"|4 || align="center"|– || 245 || 5,321 || 726 || 285 || 1,733 || 21.7 || 3.0 || 1.2 || 7.1 || align=center|
|-
|align="left"| || align="center"|G/F || align="left"|Georgia || align="center"|1 || align="center"| || 27 || 496 || 60 || 48 || 136 || 18.4 || 2.2 || 1.8 || 5.0 || align=center|
|-
|align="left"| || align="center"|F || align="left"|Missouri State || align="center"|1 || align="center"| || 1 || 10 || 2 || 0 || 3 || 10.0 || 2.0 || 0.0 || 3.0 || align=center|
|-
|align="left"| || align="center"|F || align="left"|Greece || align="center"|1 || align="center"| || 2 || 6 || 1 || 0 || 6 || 3.0 || 0.5 || 0.0 || 3.0 || align=center|
|-
|align="left" bgcolor="#FFCC00"|+ || align="center"|F || align="left"|Syracuse || align="center"|7 || align="center"|– || 412 || 14,813 || 2,865 || 1,328 || 10,186 || 36.0 || 7.0 || 3.2 || 24.7 || align=center|
|-
|align="left"| || align="center"|G || align="left"|UNLV || align="center"|4 || align="center"|– || 293 || 6,146 || 559 || 1,237 || 1,906 || 21.0 || 1.9 || 4.2 || 6.5 || align=center|
|-
|align="left"| || align="center"|F || align="left"|UCLA || align="center"|2 || align="center"|– || 116 || 2,091 || 379 || 131 || 633 || 18.0 || 3.3 || 1.1 || 5.5 || align=center|
|-
|align="left"| || align="center"|G || align="left"|Indiana State || align="center"|1 || align="center"| || 25 || 288 || 42 || 32 || 93 || 11.5 || 1.7 || 1.3 || 3.7 || align=center|
|-
|align="left"| || align="center"|G/F || align="left"|Eastern Kentucky || align="center"|4 || align="center"|– || 257 || 6,363 || 790 || 531 || 2,462 || 24.8 || 3.1 || 2.1 || 9.6 || align=center|
|-
|align="left"| || align="center"|F/C || align="left"|Rutgers || align="center"|2 || align="center"|– || 122 || 2,542 || 678 || 89 || 918 || 20.8 || 5.6 || 0.7 || 7.5 || align=center|
|-
|align="left"| || align="center"|G || align="left"|Wichita State || align="center"|3 || align="center"|– || 92 || 1,349 || 135 || 167 || 300 || 14.7 || 1.5 || 1.8 || 3.3 || align=center|
|-
|align="left"| || align="center"|F || align="left"|Hartford || align="center"|2 || align="center"|– || 41 || 504 || 107 || 21 || 146 || 12.3 || 2.6 || 0.5 || 3.6 || align=center|
|-
|align="left"| || align="center"|F || align="left"|South Carolina || align="center"|4 || align="center"|–– || 150 || 2,149 || 539 || 89 || 603 || 14.3 || 3.6 || 0.6 || 4.0 || align=center|
|-
|align="left"| || align="center"|F/C || align="left"|Saint Augustine's || align="center"|2 || align="center"|– || 145 || 2,809 || 652 || 81 || 1,110 || 19.4 || 4.5 || 0.6 || 7.7 || align=center|
|-
|align="left"| || align="center"|F/C || align="left"|Italy || align="center"|2 || align="center"|– || 71 || 2,042 || 349 || 91 || 988 || 28.8 || 4.9 || 1.3 || 13.9 || align=center|
|-
|align="left"| || align="center"|F/C || align="left"|Hawaii || align="center"|1 || align="center"| || 22 || 329 || 83 || 9 || 102 || 15.0 || 3.8 || 0.4 || 4.6 || align=center|
|-
|align="left"| || align="center"|F/C || align="left"|UTEP || align="center"|2 || align="center"|– || 82 || 2,849 || 801 || 102 || 1,269 || 34.7 || 9.8 || 1.2 || 15.5 || align=center|
|-
|align="left"| || align="center"|F || align="left"|UCLA || align="center"|1 || align="center"| || 6 || 93 || 24 || 6 || 26 || 15.5 || 4.0 || 1.0 || 4.3 || align=center|
|-
|align="left" bgcolor="#FFCC00"|+ (#12) || align="center"|G/F || align="left"|Tennessee State || align="center"|9 || align="center"|– || 604 || 18,442 || 1,682 || 1,730 || 9,442 || 30.5 || 2.8 || 2.9 || 15.6 || align=center|
|-
|align="left"| || align="center"|G/F || align="left"|Oregon || align="center"|2 || align="center"|– || 99 || 1,564 || 139 || 129 || 601 || 15.8 || 1.4 || 1.3 || 6.1 || align=center|
|-
|align="left" bgcolor="#CCFFCC"| x|| align="center"|G || align="left"|Duke || align="center"|1 || align="center"| || 56 || 1,704 || 279 || 143 || 803 || 30.4 || 5.0 || 2.6 || 14.3 || align=center|
|-
|align="left"| || align="center"|C || align="left"|Memphis || align="center"|2 || align="center"| || 8 || 269 || 95 || 10 || 93 || 33.6 || 11.9 || 1.3 || 11.6 || align=center|
|-
|align="left"| || align="center"|F || align="left"|NC State || align="center"|1 || align="center"| || 2 ||  ||  || 0 || 4 ||  ||  || 0.0 || 2.0 || align=center|
|-
|align="left"| || align="center"|G || align="left"|Louisville || align="center"|4 || align="center"|– || 216 || 4,595 || 704 || 675 || 1,641 || 21.3 || 3.3 || 3.1 || 7.6 || align=center|
|-
|align="left"| || align="center"|F || align="left"|Kansas State || align="center"|1 || align="center"| || 74 || 1,653 || 414 || 123 || 976 || 22.3 || 5.6 || 1.7 || 13.2 || align=center|
|-
|align="left"| || align="center"|F/C || align="left"|Minnesota || align="center"|1 || align="center"| || 5 || 38 || 11 || 2 || 12 || 7.6 || 2.2 || 0.4 || 2.4 || align=center|
|-
|align="left"| || align="center"|F || align="left"|Drake || align="center"|3 || align="center"|– || 63 || 545 || 119 || 28 || 175 || 8.7 || 1.9 || 0.4 || 2.8 || align=center|
|-
|align="left"| || align="center"|G || align="left"|NC State || align="center"|2 || align="center"|– || 36 || 494 || 94 || 56 || 183 || 13.7 || 2.6 || 1.6 || 5.1 || align=center|
|-
|align="left" bgcolor="#FFFF99"|^ || align="center"|C || align="left"|Indiana || align="center"|4 || align="center"|– || 268 || 9,925 || 3,562 || 664 || 5,072 || 37.0 || bgcolor="#CFECEC"|13.3 || 2.5 || 18.9 || align=center|
|-
|align="left"| || align="center"|F || align="left"|Picayune Memorial HS (MS) || align="center"|1 || align="center"| || 25 || 292 || 52 || 16 || 118 || 11.7 || 2.1 || 0.6 || 4.7 || align=center|
|-
|align="left"| || align="center"|C || align="left"|Utah || align="center"|1 || align="center"| || 6 || 40 || 8 || 1 || 8 || 6.7 || 1.3 || 0.2 || 1.3 || align=center|
|-
|align="left"| || align="center"|G || align="left"|UCLA || align="center"|3 || align="center"|– || 168 || 2,337 || 302 || 260 || 1,149 || 13.9 || 1.8 || 1.5 || 6.8 || align=center|
|-
|align="left"| || align="center"|G || align="left"|Arizona || align="center"|1 || align="center"| || 39 || 557 || 59 || 80 || 103 || 14.3 || 1.5 || 2.1 || 2.6 || align=center|
|-
|align="left"| || align="center"|G || align="left"|Colorado || align="center"|1 || align="center"| || 21 || 664 || 65 || 116 || 368 || 31.6 || 3.1 || 5.5 || 17.5 || align=center|
|-
|align="left"| || align="center"|F || align="left"|Kentucky || align="center"|1 || align="center"| || 11 || 45 || 12 || 4 || 25 || 4.1 || 1.1 || 0.4 || 2.3 || align=center|
|-
|align="left"| || align="center"|G || align="left"|Kansas State || align="center"|2 || align="center"|– || 115 || 2,403 || 195 || 233 || 980 || 20.9 || 1.7 || 2.0 || 8.5 || align=center|
|-
|align="left"| || align="center"|G || align="left"|Holy Cross || align="center"|1 || align="center"| || 36 || 363 || 36 || 45 || 117 || 10.1 || 1.0 || 1.3 || 3.3 || align=center|
|-
|align="left"| || align="center"|F || align="left"|Auburn Montgomery || align="center"|1 || align="center"| || 2 || 5 || 1 || 0 || 3 || 2.5 || 0.5 || 0.0 || 1.5 || align=center|
|-
|align="left"| || align="center"|F || align="left"|Saint Louis || align="center"|2 || align="center"|– || 131 || 2,528 || 606 || 168 || 595 || 19.3 || 4.6 || 1.3 || 4.5 || align=center|
|-
|align="left"| || align="center"|F || align="left"|Kansas State || align="center"|2 || align="center"|– || 129 || 3,791 || 1,022 || 171 || 1,992 || 29.4 || 7.9 || 1.3 || 15.4 || align=center|
|-
|align="left" bgcolor="#FFCC00"|+ || align="center"|F || align="left"|Denver || align="center"|5 || align="center"|– || 285 || 5,162 || 831 || 610 || 3,187 || 32.3 || 3.7 || 2.1 || 11.2 || align=center|
|-
|align="left"| || align="center"|G/F || align="left"|Oklahoma || align="center"|1 || align="center"| || 27 || 224 || 26 || 11 || 75 || 8.3 || 1.0 || 0.4 || 2.8 || align=center|
|-
|align="left"| || align="center"|C || align="left"|Wichita State || align="center"|3 || align="center"|– || 190 || 1,623 || 590 || 119 || 544 || 8.5 || 3.1 || 0.6 || 2.9 || align=center|
|-
|align="left"| || align="center"|F || align="left"|Villanova || align="center"|1 || align="center"| || 39 || 331 || 65 || 11 || 137 || 8.5 || 1.7 || 0.3 || 3.5 || align=center|
|-
|align="left" bgcolor="#FFFF99"|^ (#24) || align="center"|G || align="left"|Princeton || align="center"|10 || align="center"|– || 742 || 22,799 || 2,354 || 2,533 || 9,217 || 30.7 || 3.2 || 3.4 || 12.4 || align=center|
|-
|align="left" bgcolor="#CCFFCC"| x|| align="center"|F || align="left"|Michigan || align="center"|1 || align="center"| || 9 || 53 || 5 || 4 || 17 || 5.9 || 0.6 || 0.4 || 1.9 || align=center|
|-
|align="left" bgcolor="#FFFF99"|^ || align="center"|G/F || align="left"|Colgate || align="center"|12 || align="center"|–– || 740 || 17,995 || 2,072 || 2,821 || 10,449 || 31.6 || 3.6 || 3.8 || 14.1 || align=center|
|-
|align="left"| || align="center"|F || align="left"|North Carolina || align="center"|1 || align="center"| || 16 || 136 || 31 || 6 || 40 || 8.5 || 1.9 || 0.4 || 2.5 || align=center|
|-
|align="left"| || align="center"|G || align="left"|Auburn || align="center"|1 || align="center"| || 18 || 185 || 22 || 12 || 31 || 10.3 || 1.2 || 0.7 || 1.7 || align=center|
|-
|align="left"| || align="center"|G/F || align="left"|Arkansas || align="center"|1 || align="center"| || 46 || 711 || 100 || 40 || 166 || 15.5 || 2.2 || 0.9 || 3.6 || align=center|
|-
|align="left"| || align="center"|F || align="left"|Dartmouth || align="center"|1 || align="center"| || 12 ||  ||  || 1 || 34 ||  ||  || 0.1 || 2.8 || align=center|
|-
|align="left"| || align="center"|G || align="left"|UC Irvine || align="center"|1 || align="center"| || 38 || 251 || 18 || 29 || 57 || 6.6 || 0.5 || 0.8 || 1.5 || align=center|
|-
|align="left"| || align="center"|F || align="left"|Xavier || align="center"|1 || align="center"| || 8 || 88 || 15 || 4 || 34 || 11.0 || 1.9 || 0.5 || 4.3 || align=center|
|-
|align="left"| || align="center"|G || align="left"|Michigan State || align="center"|1 || align="center"| || 19 || 148 || 15 || 4 || 40 || 7.8 || 0.8 || 0.2 || 2.1 || align=center|
|-
|align="left"| || align="center"|G || align="left"|Temple || align="center"|3 || align="center"|– || 69 || 450 || 49 || 75 || 108 || 6.5 || 0.7 || 1.1 || 1.6 || align=center|
|-
|align="left"| || align="center"|G || align="left"|DePaul || align="center"|4 || align="center"|– || 288 || 5,086 || 743 || 735 || 1,704 || 17.7 || 2.6 || 2.6 || 5.9 || align=center|
|-
|align="left"| || align="center"|F/C || align="left"|Jackson State || align="center"|2 || align="center"|– || 68 || 723 || 240 || 44 || 411 || 10.6 || 3.5 || 0.6 || 6.0 || align=center|
|-
|align="left"| || align="center"|F || align="left"|Wake Forest || align="center"|5 || align="center"|– || 353 || 6,389 || 1,623 || 337 || 2,505 || 18.1 || 4.6 || 1.0 || 7.1 || align=center|
|-
|align="left" bgcolor="#CCFFCC"| x|| align="center"|G || align="left"|North Carolina || align="center"|1 || align="center"| || 29 || 684 || 68 || 42 || 234 || 23.6 || 2.3 || 1.4 || 8.1 || align=center|
|-
|align="left"| || align="center"|F || align="left"|Cal State Fullerton || align="center"|1 || align="center"| || 12 || 97 || 17 || 4 || 28 || 8.1 || 1.4 || 0.3 || 2.3 || align=center|
|-
|align="left"| || align="center"|G || align="left"|NYU || align="center"|1 || align="center"| || 14 || 146 || 13 || 10 || 41 || 10.4 || 0.9 || 0.7 || 2.9 || align=center|
|-
|align="left"| || align="center"|G || align="left"|Utah || align="center"|2 || align="center"|– || 63 || 623 || 66 || 63 || 349 || 9.9 || 1.0 || 1.0 || 5.5 || align=center|
|-
|align="left"| || align="center"|G || align="left"|Michigan || align="center"|2 || align="center"|– || 69 || 1,474 || 133 || 264 || 849 || 21.4 || 1.9 || 3.8 || 12.3 || align=center|
|-
|align="left"| || align="center"|F || align="left"|Michigan State || align="center"|1 || align="center"| || 8 || 28 || 5 || 1 || 15 || 3.5 || 0.6 || 0.1 || 1.9 || align=center|
|-
|align="left"| || align="center"|G || align="left"|Pikeville || align="center"|3 || align="center"|– || 141 || 2,090 || 326 || 255 || 729 || 14.8 || 2.3 || 1.8 || 5.2 || align=center|
|-
|align="left"| || align="center"|G || align="left"|Niagara || align="center"|3 || align="center"|– || 204 || 4,836 || 662 || 514 || 2,192 || 23.7 || 3.2 || 2.5 || 10.7 || align=center|
|-
|align="left"| || align="center"|C || align="left"|Stanford || align="center"|2 || align="center"|– || 46 || 173 || 37 || 3 || 62 || 3.8 || 0.8 || 0.1 || 1.3 || align=center|
|-
|align="left"| || align="center"|F/C || align="left"|Coastal Christian Academy (VA) || align="center"|2 || align="center"|– || 58 || 745 || 183 || 25 || 302 || 12.8 || 3.2 || 0.4 || 5.2 || align=center|
|-
|align="left"| || align="center"|G/F || align="left"|Seton Hall || align="center"|3 || align="center"|– || 142 ||  ||  || 106 || 952 ||  ||  || 0.7 || 6.7 || align=center|
|}

C

|-
|align="left"| || align="center"|G || align="left"|Spain || align="center"|2 || align="center"|– || 114 || 3,294 || 353 || 496 || 926 || 28.9 || 3.1 || 4.4 || 8.1 || align=center|
|-
|align="left"| || align="center"|C || align="left"|Georgia Tech || align="center"|1 || align="center"| || 2 || 7 || 1 || 1 || 0 || 3.5 || 0.5 || 0.5 || 0.0 || align=center|
|-
|align="left"| || align="center"|F/C || align="left"|UMass || align="center"|5 || align="center"|– || 221 || 5,877 || 1,839 || 160 || 2,053 || 26.6 || 8.3 || 0.7 || 9.3 || align=center|
|-
|align="left"| || align="center"|G/F || align="left"|Ohio State || align="center"|2 || align="center"|– || 80 || 1,441 || 215 || 93 || 606 || 18.0 || 2.7 || 1.2 || 7.6 || align=center|
|-
|align="left"| || align="center"|G || align="left"|Virginia || align="center"|1 || align="center"| || 26 || 204 || 13 || 32 || 74 || 7.8 || 0.5 || 1.2 || 2.8 || align=center|
|-
|align="left"| || align="center"|G || align="left"|Hawaii || align="center"|1 || align="center"| || 19 || 310 || 39 || 43 || 84 || 16.3 || 2.1 || 2.3 || 4.4 || align=center|
|-
|align="left"| || align="center"|G || align="left"|Indiana || align="center"|2 || align="center"|– || 74 || 1,310 || 98 || 170 || 553 || 17.7 || 1.3 || 2.3 || 7.5 || align=center|
|-
|align="left"| || align="center"|G || align="left"|St. John's || align="center"|2 || align="center"|– || 135 || 1,459 || 164 || 206 || 471 || 10.8 || 1.2 || 1.5 || 3.5 || align=center|
|-
|align="left" bgcolor="#FFCC00"|+ || align="center"|C || align="left"|San Francisco || align="center"|8 || align="center"|–– || 537 || 16,791 || 3,838 || 792 || 9,006 || 31.3 || 7.1 || 1.5 || 16.8 || align=center|
|-
|align="left"| || align="center"|C || align="left"|Iowa State || align="center"|1 || align="center"| || 18 || 95 || 31 || 0 || 22 || 5.3 || 1.7 || 0.0 || 1.2 || align=center|
|-
|align="left"| || align="center"|C || align="left"|Texas Southern || align="center"|1 || align="center"| || 53 || 653 || 166 || 19 || 78 || 12.3 || 3.1 || 0.4 || 1.5 || align=center|
|-
|align="left" bgcolor="#FFCC00"|+ || align="center"|C || align="left"|Dominguez (CA) || align="center"|3 || align="center"|– || 183 || 5,887 || 1,844 || 177 || 1,868 || 32.2 || 10.1 || 1.0 || 10.2 || align=center|
|-
|align="left"| || align="center"|F || align="left"|DePaul || align="center"|4 || align="center"|– || 233 || 7,499 || 1,223 || 427 || 3,270 || 32.2 || 5.2 || 1.8 || 14.0 || align=center|
|-
|align="left" bgcolor="#FFCC00"|+ || align="center"|F/C || align="left"|Wake Forest || align="center"|3 || align="center"|– || 167 || 3,689 || 1,034 || 124 || 1,953 || 22.1 || 6.2 || 0.7 || 11.7 || align=center|
|-
|align="left" bgcolor="#FFFF99"|^ || align="center"|G || align="left"|West Texas A&M || align="center"|2 || align="center"|– || 107 || 2,900 || 246 || 586 || 836 || 27.1 || 2.3 || 5.5 || 7.8 || align=center|
|-
|align="left"| || align="center"|G || align="left"|Boise State || align="center"|5 || align="center"|– || 303 || 7,956 || 771 || 1,380 || 1,983 || 26.3 || 2.5 || 4.6 || 6.5 || align=center|
|-
|align="left"| || align="center"|G || align="left"|Fordham || align="center"|1 || align="center"| || 6 || 48 || 8 || 7 || 20 || 8.0 || 1.3 || 1.2 || 3.3 || align=center|
|-
|align="left"| || align="center"|G/F || align="left"|Pepperdine || align="center"|2 || align="center"|– || 35 || 297 || 47 || 33 || 108 || 8.5 || 1.3 || 0.9 || 3.1 || align=center|
|-
|align="left"| || align="center"|F || align="left"|Louisville || align="center"|1 || align="center"| || 9 || 70 || 16 || 2 || 23 || 7.8 || 1.8 || 0.2 || 2.6 || align=center|
|-
|align="left"| || align="center"|G || align="left"|Ohio State || align="center"|3 || align="center"|– || 180 || 4,653 || 456 || 699 || 1,338 || 25.9 || 2.5 || 3.9 || 7.4 || align=center|
|-
|align="left"| || align="center"|F || align="left"|Ohio Wesleyan || align="center"|1 || align="center"| || 70 || 877 || 183 || 67 || 376 || 12.5 || 2.6 || 1.0 || 5.4 || align=center|
|-
|align="left" bgcolor="#FFFF99"|^ || align="center"|F/C || align="left"|Xavier (LS) || align="center"|7 || align="center"|– || 476 || 12,934 || 4,066 || 1,291 || 4,919 || 31.5 || 8.5 || 2.7 || 10.3 || align=center|
|-
|align="left"| || align="center"|C || align="left"|Kentucky || align="center"|1 || align="center"| || 54 ||  ||  || 22 || 238 ||  ||  || 0.4 || 4.4 || align=center|
|-
|align="left"| || align="center"|G || align="left"|Eastern Michigan || align="center"|1 || align="center"| || 45 || 469 || 46 || 82 || 165 || 10.4 || 1.0 || 1.8 || 3.7 || align=center|
|-
|align="left"| || align="center"|G || align="left"|Temple || align="center"|3 || align="center"|– || 107 || 1,486 || 187 || 182 || 400 || 13.9 || 1.7 || 1.7 || 3.7 || align=center|
|-
|align="left"| || align="center"|F || align="left"|Bloomsburg || align="center"|1 || align="center"| || 15 ||  ||  || 9 || 83 ||  ||  || 0.6 || 5.5 || align=center|
|-
|align="left"| || align="center"|F/C || align="left"|Washington State || align="center"|2 || align="center"|– || 116 || 2,095 || 625 || 91 || 822 || 18.1 || 5.4 || 0.8 || 7.1 || align=center|
|-
|align="left"| || align="center"|G/F || align="left"|Utah State || align="center"|1 || align="center"| || 37 || 424 || 72 || 33 || 118 || 11.5 || 1.9 || 0.9 || 3.2 || align=center|
|-
|align="left"| || align="center"|F || align="left"|Colorado || align="center"|1 || align="center"| || 56 || 862 || 119 || 27 || 486 || 15.4 || 2.1 || 0.5 || 8.7 || align=center|
|-
|align="left"| || align="center"|F || align="left"|Rutgers || align="center"|2 || align="center"| || 93 || 1,260 || 161 || 89 || 464 || 13.5 || 1.7 || 1.0 || 5.0 || align=center|
|-
|align="left"| || align="center"|G/F || align="left"|St. Bonaventure || align="center"|2 || align="center"|– || 50 || 618 || 131 || 58 || 279 || 12.4 || 2.6 || 1.2 || 5.6 || align=center|
|-
|align="left"| || align="center"|G || align="left"|Michigan || align="center"|5 || align="center"|– || 299 || 11,023 || 864 || 1,308 || 5,269 || 36.9 || 2.9 || 4.4 || 17.6 || align=center|
|-
|align="left"| || align="center"|F || align="left"|Kentucky || align="center"|1 || align="center"| || 2 || 23 || 4 || 1 || 9 || 11.5 || 2.0 || 0.5 || 4.5 || align=center|
|-
|align="left"| || align="center"|F/C || align="left"|Cincinnati || align="center"|4 || align="center"|– || 205 || 5,078 || 1,345 || 231 || 2,246 || 24.8 || 6.6 || 1.1 || 11.0 || align=center|
|-
|align="left"| || align="center"|F || align="left"|DePaul || align="center"|1 || align="center"| || 30 || 529 || 135 || 26 || 234 || 17.6 || 4.5 || 0.9 || 7.8 || align=center|
|-
|align="left"| || align="center"|C || align="left"|Thornwood HS (IL) || align="center"|5 || align="center"|– || 222 || 6,318 || 1,295 || 119 || 3,367 || 28.5 || 5.8 || 0.5 || 15.2 || align=center|
|}

D

|-
|align="left"| || align="center"|C || align="left"|Seton Hall || align="center"|1 || align="center"| || 32 || 544 || 168 || 29 || 128 || 17.0 || 5.3 || 0.9 || 4.0 || align=center|
|-
|align="left"| || align="center"|G || align="left"|VCU || align="center"|1 || align="center"| || 47 || 401 || 37 || 30 || 170 || 8.5 || 0.8 || 0.6 || 3.6 || align=center|
|-
|align="left"| || align="center"|F/C || align="left"|UTEP || align="center"|1 || align="center"| || 36 || 749 || 172 || 14 || 181 || 20.8 || 4.8 || 0.4 || 5.0 || align=center|
|-
|align="left"| || align="center"|G || align="left"|UCLA || align="center"|1 || align="center"| || 29 || 595 || 56 || 135 || 178 || 20.5 || 1.9 || 4.7 || 6.1 || align=center|
|-
|align="left"| || align="center"|F || align="left"|Arizona || align="center"|2 || align="center"|– || 15 || 34 || 17 || 3 || 21 || 2.3 || 1.1 || 0.2 || 1.4 || align=center|
|-
|align="left"| || align="center"|G || align="left"|North Carolina || align="center"|4 || align="center"|– || 262 || 5,618 || 356 || 501 || 2,492 || 21.4 || 1.4 || 1.9 || 9.5 || align=center|
|-
|align="left"| || align="center"|F || align="left"|St. John's || align="center"|4 || align="center"|– || 156 || 1,820 || 623 || 117 || 712 || 11.7 || 4.0 || 0.8 || 4.6 || align=center|
|-
|align="left"| || align="center"|F || align="left"|Maryland || align="center"|1 || align="center"| || 8 || 28 || 10 || 0 || 14 || 3.5 || 1.3 || 0.0 || 1.8 || align=center|
|-
|align="left" bgcolor="#FFFF99"|^ (#22) || align="center"|G/F || align="left"|Detroit Mercy || align="center"|6 || align="center"|– || 435 || 15,967 || 4,671 || 1,345 || 6,957 || 36.7 || 10.7 || 3.1 || 16.0 || align=center|
|-
|align="left"| || align="center"|F/C || align="left"|Arizona || align="center"|3 || align="center"|– || 206 || 3,192 || 805 || 106 || 976 || 15.5 || 3.9 || 0.5 || 4.7 || align=center|
|-
|align="left"| || align="center"|G || align="left"|Rochester || align="center"|1 || align="center"| || 19 || 93 || 21 || 15 || 21 || 4.9 || 1.1 || 0.8 || 1.1 || align=center|
|-
|align="left"| || align="center"|C || align="left"|Utah || align="center"|2 || align="center"|– || 121 || 1,726 || 408 || 72 || 559 || 14.3 || 3.4 || 0.6 || 4.6 || align=center|
|-
|align="left"| || align="center"|C || align="left"|Washington State || align="center"|1 || align="center"| || 14 || 81 || 19 || 2 || 12 || 5.8 || 1.4 || 0.1 || 0.9 || align=center|
|-
|align="left"| || align="center"|G || align="left"|Providence || align="center"|1 || align="center"| || 44 || 364 || 25 || 87 || 105 || 8.3 || 0.6 || 2.0 || 2.4 || align=center|
|-
|align="left"| || align="center"|G || align="left"|Muhlenberg || align="center"|1 || align="center"| || 45 ||  ||  || 38 || 253 ||  ||  || 0.8 || 5.6 || align=center|
|-
|align="left" bgcolor="#CCFFCC"|x || align="center"|G || align="left"|Houston || align="center"|3 || align="center"|– || 165 || 3,314 || 437 || 223 || 1,282 || 20.1 || 2.6 || 1.4 || 7.8 || align=center|
|-
|align="left"| || align="center"|G || align="left"|Florida State || align="center"|3 || align="center"|– || 175 || 3,714 || 424 || 433 || 1,574 || 21.2 || 2.4 || 2.5 || 9.0 || align=center|
|-
|align="left"| || align="center"|C || align="left"|Yale || align="center"|3 || align="center"|– || 144 || 2,002 || 604 || 33 || 327 || 13.9 || 4.2 || 0.2 || 2.3 || align=center|
|-
|align="left"| || align="center"|G || align="left"|Colgate || align="center"|1 || align="center"| || 4 || 50 || 6 || 5 || 16 || 12.5 || 1.5 || 1.3 || 4.0 || align=center|
|-
|align="left"| || align="center"|G || align="left"|Duke || align="center"|2 || align="center"|– || 146 || 4,978 || 424 || 944 || 1,374 || 34.1 || 2.9 || 6.5 || 9.4 || align=center|
|-
|align="left"| || align="center"|C || align="left"|Seton Hall || align="center"|1 || align="center"| || 60 || 1,290 || 443 || 39 || 465 || 21.5 || 7.4 || 0.7 || 7.8 || align=center|
|}

E to F

|-
|align="left"| || align="center"|F || align="left"|Wichita State || align="center"|2 || align="center"|– || 56 || 801 || 123 || 42 || 241 || 14.3 || 2.2 || 0.8 || 4.3 || align=center|
|-
|align="left"| || align="center"|C || align="left"|Ole Miss || align="center"|1 || align="center"| || 4 || 13 || 1 || 0 || 4 || 3.3 || 0.3 || 0.0 || 1.0 || align=center|
|-
|align="left"| || align="center"|G || align="left"|Providence || align="center"|3 || align="center"|– || 123 || 3,210 || 274 || 508 || 1,289 || 26.1 || 2.2 || 4.1 || 10.5 || align=center|
|-
|align="left"| || align="center"|G || align="left"|Boston College || align="center"|3 || align="center"|– || 154 || 3,582 || 301 || 700 || 1,135 || 23.3 || 2.0 || 4.5 || 7.4 || align=center|
|-
|align="left"| || align="center"|C || align="left"|West Texas A&M || align="center"|1 || align="center"| || 3 ||  || 8 || 0 || 4 ||  || 2.7 || 0.0 || 1.3 || align=center|
|-
|align="left"| || align="center"|F || align="left"|Marquette || align="center"|1 || align="center"| || 17 || 234 || 57 || 15 || 102 || 13.8 || 3.4 || 0.9 || 6.0 || align=center|
|-
|align="left" bgcolor="#CCFFCC"| x|| align="center"|SG || align="left"|North Carolina || align="center"|1 || align="center"| || 36 || 558 || 65 || 44 || 183 || 15.5 || 1.8 || 1.2 || 5.1 || align=center|
|-
|align="left"| || align="center"|F/C || align="left"|Maryland || align="center"|1 || align="center"| || 65 || 832 || 165 || 30 || 155 || 12.8 || 2.5 || 0.5 || 2.4 || align=center|
|-
|align="left" bgcolor="#FFFF99"|^ (#33) || align="center"|F/C || align="left"|Georgetown || align="center" bgcolor="#CFECEC"|15 || align="center"|– || bgcolor="#CFECEC"|1,039 || bgcolor="#CFECEC"|37,586 || bgcolor="#CFECEC"|10,759 || 2,088 || bgcolor="#CFECEC"|23,665 || 36.2 || 10.4 || 2.0 || 22.8 || align=center|
|-
|align="left"| || align="center"|F || align="left"|San Francisco || align="center"|3 || align="center"|– || 141 || 3,087 || 702 || 123 || 929 || 21.9 || 5.0 || 0.9 || 6.6 || align=center|
|-
|align="left"| || align="center"|C || align="left"|LIU Brooklyn || align="center"|6 || align="center"|– || 376 || 8,831 || 3,426 || 253 || 4,499 || 23.5 || 9.1 || 0.7 || 12.0 || align=center|
|-
|align="left"| || align="center"|G || align="left"|North Carolina || align="center"|3 || align="center"|– || 187 || 6,404 || 585 || 1,225 || 2,501 || 34.2 || 3.1 || 6.6 || 13.4 || align=center|
|-
|align="left"| || align="center"|F/C || align="left"|San Francisco || align="center"|1 || align="center"| || 32 || 402 || 86 || 11 || 83 || 12.6 || 2.7 || 0.3 || 2.6 || align=center|
|-
|align="left"| || align="center"|F || align="left"|Stanford || align="center"|2 || align="center"|– || 148 || 4,435 || 799 || 324 || 1,377 || 30.0 || 5.4 || 2.2 || 9.3 || align=center|
|-
|align="left"| || align="center"|C || align="left"|Cheyney || align="center"|2 || align="center"|– || 49 || 338 || 108 || 20 || 118 || 6.9 || 2.2 || 0.4 || 2.4 || align=center|
|-
|align="left"| || align="center"|C || align="left"|UNC Wilmington || align="center"|1 || align="center"| || 2 || 17 || 3 || 1 || 12 || 8.5 || 1.5 || 0.5 || 6.0 || align=center|
|-
|align="left"| || align="center"|F/C || align="left"|Seton Hall || align="center"|1 || align="center"| || 29 ||  ||  || 9 || 82 ||  ||  || 0.3 || 2.8 || align=center|
|-
|align="left"| || align="center"|G || align="left"|Canisius || align="center"|1 || align="center"| || 2 || 14 || 3 || 0 || 2 || 7.0 || 1.5 || 0.0 || 1.0 || align=center|
|-
|align="left"| || align="center"|F || align="left"|Holy Cross || align="center"|1 || align="center"| || 6 || 37 || 9 || 5 || 21 || 6.2 || 1.5 || 0.8 || 3.5 || align=center|
|-
|align="left"| || align="center"|G || align="left"|Maryland || align="center"|2 || align="center"|– || 68 || 1,896 || 228 || 253 || 755 || 27.9 || 3.4 || 3.7 || 11.1 || align=center|
|-
|align="left" bgcolor="#FFFF99"|^ (#10) || align="center"|G || align="left"|Southern Illinois || align="center"|10 || align="center"|– || 759 || 28,995 || 4,598 || bgcolor="#CFECEC"|4,791 || 14,617 || 38.2 || 6.1 || 6.3 || 19.3 || align=center|
|-
|align="left"| || align="center"|G || align="left"|BYU || align="center"|1 || align="center"| || 2 || 5 || 0 || 0 || 7 || 2.5 || 0.0 || 0.0 || 3.5 || align=center|
|-
|align="left"| || align="center"|F || align="left"|LIU Brooklyn || align="center"|1 || align="center"| || 23 ||  ||  || 14 || 88 ||  ||  || 0.6 || 3.8 || align=center|
|-
|align="left"| || align="center"|G/F || align="left"|California || align="center"|1 || align="center"| || 44 || 569 || 106 || 47 || 175 || 12.9 || 2.4 || 1.1 || 4.0 || align=center|
|-
|align="left"| || align="center"|F/C || align="left"|Arizona || align="center"|2 || align="center"|– || 137 || 3,468 || 769 || 120 || 1,486 || 25.3 || 5.6 || 0.9 || 10.8 || align=center|
|}

G

|-
|align="left"| || align="center"|C || align="left"|UCLA || align="center"|1 || align="center"| || 2 || 13 || 5 || 0 || 0 || 6.5 || 2.5 || 0.0 || 0.0 || align=center|
|-
|align="left"| || align="center"|G || align="left"|Loyola Marymount || align="center"|1 || align="center"| || 18 || 78 || 13 || 30 || 33 || 4.3 || 0.7 || 1.7 || 1.8 || align=center|
|-
|align="left" bgcolor="#FFFF99"|^ || align="center"|F/C || align="left"|Truman || align="center"|9 || align="center"|– || 610 || 13,823 || 5,935 || 1,122 || 7,771 || 32.6 || 12.1 || 1.8 || 12.7 || align=center|
|-
|align="left"| || align="center"|F || align="left"|Italy || align="center"|3 || align="center"|– || 157 || 4,830 || 682 || 232 || 2,155 || 30.8 || 4.3 || 1.5 || 13.7 || align=center|
|-
|align="left"| || align="center"|G || align="left"|Saint Joseph's || align="center"|2 || align="center"|– || 127 || 3,490 || 478 || 357 || 1,158 || 27.5 || 3.8 || 2.8 || 9.1 || align=center|
|-
|align="left"| || align="center"|G/F || align="left"|Minnesota || align="center"|2 || align="center"|– || 97 || 2,983 || 401 || 293 || 1,441 || 30.8 || 4.1 || 3.0 || 14.9 || align=center|
|-
|align="left"| || align="center"|G || align="left"|DePaul || align="center"|1 || align="center"| || 4 || 63 || 3 || 7 || 26 || 15.8 || 0.8 || 1.8 || 6.5 || align=center|
|-
|align="left"| || align="center"|G || align="left"|Southern Illinois || align="center"|1 || align="center"| || 25 || 239 || 26 || 14 || 74 || 9.6 || 1.0 || 0.6 || 3.0 || align=center|
|-
|align="left"| || align="center"|G || align="left"|La Salle || align="center"|3 || align="center"|– || 110 || 2,366 || 311 || 334 || 903 || 21.5 || 2.8 || 3.0 || 8.2 || align=center|
|-
|align="left"| || align="center"|F/C || align="left"|Pacific || align="center"|5 || align="center"|– || 303 || 7,698 || 1,912 || 406 || 2,481 || 25.4 || 6.3 || 1.3 || 8.2 || align=center|
|-
|align="left" bgcolor="#CCFFCC"| x|| align="center"|PF || align="left"|USC || align="center"|1 || align="center"| || 62 || 1,025 || 267 || 52 || 379 || 16.5 || 4.3 || 0.8 || 6.1 || align=center|
|-
|align="left"| || align="center"|G || align="left"|New Mexico || align="center"|1 || align="center"| || 11 || 140 || 31 || 7 || 45 || 12.7 || 2.8 || 0.6 || 4.1 || align=center|
|-
|align="left"| || align="center"|G || align="left"|Southern Illinois || align="center"|3 || align="center"|– || 232 || 3,477 || 236 || 329 || 1,696 || 15.0 || 1.0 || 1.4 || 7.3 || align=center|
|-
|align="left" bgcolor="#FFFF99"|^ || align="center"|G/F || align="left"|La Salle || align="center"|4 || align="center"|– || 277 || 6,858 || 1,446 || 893 || 2,161 || 24.8 || 5.2 || 3.2 || 7.8 || align=center|
|-
|align="left"| || align="center"|G/F || align="left"|UNLV || align="center"|2 || align="center"|– || 147 || 2,619 || 674 || 189 || 722 || 17.8 || 4.6 || 1.3 || 4.9 || align=center|
|-
|align="left"| || align="center"|G || align="left"|DeWitt Clinton HS (NY) || align="center"|2 || align="center"|– || 84 ||  ||  || 36 || 465 ||  ||  || 0.4 || 5.5 || align=center|
|-
|align="left"| || align="center"|F || align="left"|New Orleans || align="center"|2 || align="center"|– || 8 || 65 || 18 || 4 || 20 || 8.1 || 2.3 || 0.5 || 2.5 || align=center|
|-
|align="left"| || align="center"|G || align="left"|Villanova || align="center"|1 || align="center"| || 15 || 166 || 17 || 27 || 49 || 11.1 || 1.1 || 1.8 || 3.3 || align=center|
|-
|align="left"| || align="center"|G || align="left"|Michigan || align="center"|1 || align="center"| || 47 || 596 || 52 || 69 || 232 || 12.7 || 1.1 || 1.5 || 4.9 || align=center|
|-
|align="left"| || align="center"|G || align="left"|TCNJ || align="center"|1 || align="center"| || 22 || 107 || 10 || 20 || 26 || 4.9 || 0.5 || 0.9 || 1.2 || align=center|
|-
|align="left"| || align="center"|G || align="left"|Notre Dame || align="center"|1 || align="center"| || 76 || 1,265 || 143 || 177 || 426 || 16.6 || 1.9 || 2.3 || 5.6 || align=center|
|-
|align="left"| || align="center"|F/C || align="left"|UCLA || align="center"|2 || align="center"|– || 27 || 131 || 24 || 2 || 26 || 4.9 || 0.9 || 0.1 || 1.0 || align=center|
|-
|align="left" bgcolor="#FFCC00"|+ || align="center"|F/C || align="left"|Michigan State || align="center"|7 || align="center"|– || 472 || 12,420 || 4,825 || 789 || 6,114 || 26.3 || 10.2 || 1.7 || 13.0 || align=center|
|-
|align="left"| || align="center"|F || align="left"|UTPA || align="center"|1 || align="center"| || 7 || 72 || 27 || 2 || 31 || 10.3 || 3.9 || 0.3 || 4.4 || align=center|
|-
|align="left"| || align="center"|F/C || align="left"|UNLV || align="center"|2 || align="center"|– || 164 || 3,326 || 1,036 || 169 || 1,159 || 20.3 || 6.3 || 1.0 || 7.1 || align=center|
|-
|align="left"| || align="center"|G || align="left"|Dayton || align="center"|1 || align="center"| || 7 || 45 || 11 || 7 || 16 || 6.4 || 1.6 || 1.0 || 2.3 || align=center|
|-
|align="left"| || align="center"|G/F || align="left"|Tennessee || align="center"|4 || align="center"|– || 298 || 5,004 || 641 || 468 || 1,680 || 16.8 || 2.2 || 1.6 || 5.6 || align=center|
|-
|align="left" bgcolor="#FFFF99"|^ || align="center"|G || align="left"|Iona || align="center"|8 || align="center"|– || 518 || 18,257 || 3,309 || 2,725 || 10,392 || 35.2 || 6.4 || 5.3 || 20.1 || align=center|
|}

H

|-
|align="left"| || align="center"|G/F || align="left"|Memphis || align="center"|3 || align="center"|– || 83 || 2,185 || 288 || 161 || 682 || 26.3 || 3.5 || 1.9 || 8.2 || align=center|
|-
|align="left"| || align="center"|G || align="left"|Michigan || align="center"|4 || align="center"|–– || 254 || 6,940 || 662 || 470 || 3,504 || 27.3 || 2.6 || 1.9 || 13.8 || align=center|
|-
|align="left" bgcolor="#CCFFCC"| x|| align="center"|F || align="left"|St. John's || align="center"|1 || align="center"| || 12 || 286 || 40 || 20 || 82 || 23.8 || 3.3 || 1.7 || 6.8 || align=center|
|-
|align="left"| || align="center"|G || align="left"|Loyola (IL) || align="center"|1 || align="center"| || 5 || 59 || 6 || 6 || 29 || 11.8 || 1.2 || 1.2 || 5.8 || align=center|
|-
|align="left"| || align="center"|G || align="left"|Illinois || align="center"|3 || align="center"|– || 216 || 6,920 || 482 || 1,046 || 2,534 || 32.0 || 2.2 || 4.8 || 11.7 || align=center|
|-
|align="left"| || align="center"|C || align="left"|Kentucky || align="center"|1 || align="center"| || 37 || 540 || 144 || 11 || 162 || 14.6 || 3.9 || 0.3 || 4.4 || align=center|
|-
|align="left"| || align="center"|F || align="left"|St. Patrick HS (NJ) || align="center"|2 || align="center"|– || 140 || 4,575 || 832 || 202 || 2,683 || 32.7 || 5.9 || 1.4 || 19.2 || align=center|
|-
|align="left"| || align="center"|F/C || align="left"|Georgetown || align="center"|4 || align="center"|– || 237 || 4,833 || 1,101 || 148 || 1,612 || 20.4 || 4.6 || 0.6 || 6.8 || align=center|
|-
|align="left"| || align="center"|F/C || align="left"|Arkansas || align="center"|1 || align="center"| || 21 || 98 || 31 || 1 || 23 || 4.7 || 1.5 || 0.0 || 1.1 || align=center|
|-
|align="left" bgcolor="#FFFF99"|^ || align="center"|F/C || align="left"|Detroit Mercy || align="center"|4 || align="center"|– || 210 || 6,701 || 1,806 || 324 || 3,587 || 31.9 || 8.6 || 1.5 || 17.1 || align=center|
|-
|align="left"| || align="center"|G || align="left"|Canisius || align="center"|1 || align="center"| || 5 || 23 || 4 || 2 || 4 || 4.6 || 0.8 || 0.4 || 0.8 || align=center|
|-
|align="left"| || align="center"|G || align="left"|VCU || align="center"|2 || align="center"|– || 74 || 1,959 || 176 || 452 || 752 || 26.5 || 2.4 || 6.1 || 10.2 || align=center|
|-
|align="left"| || align="center"|C || align="left"|Spain || align="center"|2 || align="center"|– || 98 || 1,557 || 569 || 117 || 698 || 15.9 || 5.8 || 1.2 || 7.1 || align=center|
|-
|align="left"| || align="center"|G || align="left"|CCNY || align="center"|2 || align="center"|– || 63 ||  ||  || 38 || 520 ||  ||  || 0.6 || 8.3 || align=center|
|-
|align="left"| || align="center"|G/F || align="left"|Duke || align="center"|2 || align="center"|– || 130 || 2,899 || 397 || 335 || 1,469 || 22.3 || 3.1 || 2.6 || 11.3 || align=center|
|-
|align="left"| || align="center"|G/F || align="left"|Croatia || align="center"|1 || align="center"| || 58 || 1,206 || 239 || 88 || 511 || 20.8 || 4.1 || 1.5 || 8.8 || align=center|
|-
|align="left"| || align="center"|F || align="left"|North Carolina || align="center"|2 || align="center"|– || 21 || 272 || 48 || 18 || 92 || 13.0 || 2.3 || 0.9 || 4.4 || align=center|
|-
|align="left"| || align="center"|F/C || align="left"|Arizona || align="center"|1 || align="center"| || 24 || 252 || 61 || 7 || 97 || 10.5 || 2.5 || 0.3 || 4.0 || align=center|
|-
|align="left"| || align="center"|G/F || align="left"|Purdue || align="center"|1 || align="center"| ||  ||  ||  ||  ||  ||  ||  ||  ||  || align=center|
|-
|align="left"| || align="center"|C || align="left"|Cincinnati || align="center"|2 || align="center"|– || 56 || 1,429 || 445 || 47 || 402 || 25.5 || 7.9 || 0.8 || 7.2 || align=center|
|-
|align="left"| || align="center"|F || align="left"|Washington || align="center"|1 || align="center"| || 82 || 1,639 || 225 || 102 || 629 || 20.0 || 2.7 || 1.2 || 7.7 || align=center|
|-
|align="left"| || align="center"|C || align="left"|LIU Brooklyn || align="center"|1 || align="center"| || 48 ||  ||  || 37 || 504 ||  ||  || 0.8 || 10.5 || align=center|
|-
|align="left"| || align="center"|C || align="left"|Villanova || align="center"|2 || align="center"|– || 83 || 1,141 || 389 || 48 || 319 || 13.7 || 4.7 || 0.6 || 3.8 || align=center|
|-
|align="left"| || align="center"|F/C || align="left"|Ohio State || align="center"|2 || align="center"|– || 86 || 586 || 157 || 36 || 248 || 6.8 || 1.8 || 0.4 || 2.9 || align=center|
|-
|align="left"| || align="center"|G || align="left"|Arizona State || align="center"|1 || align="center"| || 18 || 371 || 40 || 37 || 115 || 20.6 || 2.2 || 2.1 || 6.4 || align=center|
|-
|align="left" bgcolor="#FFCC00"|+ || align="center"|G || align="left"|Tennessee || align="center"|9 || align="center"|– || 602 || 21,724 || 1,847 || 1,476 || 11,165 || 36.1 || 3.1 || 2.5 || 18.5 || align=center|
|-
|align="left"| || align="center"|G || align="left"|Saint Louis || align="center"|2 || align="center"|– || 56 || 1,507 || 175 || 169 || 576 || 26.9 || 3.1 || 3.0 || 10.3 || align=center|
|-
|align="left"| || align="center"|G || align="left"|Texas Tech || align="center"|1 || align="center"| || 71 || 923 || 58 || 159 || 219 || 13.0 || 0.8 || 2.2 || 3.1 || align=center|
|-
|align="left"| || align="center"|F/C || align="left"|BYU || align="center"|1 || align="center"| || 18 || 384 || 86 || 34 || 126 || 21.3 || 4.8 || 1.9 || 7.0 || align=center|
|}

I to J

|-
|align="left"| || align="center"|C || align="left"|California || align="center"|2 || align="center"|– || 138 || 2,475 || 766 || 133 || 745 || 17.9 || 5.6 || 1.0 || 5.4 || align=center|
|-
|align="left"| || align="center"|G || align="left"|Georgia Tech || align="center"|1 || align="center"| || 62 || 1,548 || 191 || 348 || 466 || 25.0 || 3.1 || 5.6 || 7.5 || align=center|
|-
|align="left"| || align="center"|G || align="left"|Guilford || align="center"|1 || align="center"| || 5 || 27 || 2 || 3 || 8 || 5.4 || 0.4 || 0.6 || 1.6 || align=center|
|-
|align="left"| || align="center"|G || align="left"|Detroit Mercy || align="center"|1 || align="center"| || 21 || 230 || 23 || 24 || 42 || 11.0 || 1.1 || 1.1 || 2.0 || align=center|
|-
|align="left" bgcolor="#FFCC00"|+ || align="center"|G || align="left"|St. John's || align="center"|7 || align="center"|–– || 500 || 15,363 || 1,986 || 4,005 || 5,544 || 30.7 || 4.0 || bgcolor="#CFECEC"|8.0 || 11.1 || align=center|
|-
|align="left" bgcolor="#FFFF99"|^ || align="center"|F/C || align="left"|North Dakota || align="center"|10 || align="center"|–– || 732 || 12,937 || 3,252 || 801 || 4,989 || 17.7 || 4.4 || 1.1 || 6.8 || align=center|
|-
|align="left"| || align="center"|F || align="left"|Marshall || align="center"|3 || align="center"|– || 46 ||  || 4 || 29 || 97 ||  || 0.7 || 0.6 || 2.1 || align=center|
|-
|align="left"| || align="center"|C || align="left"|Florida A&M || align="center"|4 || align="center"|– || 90 || 694 || 163 || 15 || 223 || 7.7 || 1.8 || 0.2 || 2.5 || align=center|
|-
|align="left"| || align="center"|F || align="left"|Indiana || align="center"|6 || align="center"|– || 299 || 6,596 || 1,168 || 347 || 1,289 || 22.1 || 3.9 || 1.2 || 4.3 || align=center|
|-
|align="left"| || align="center"|G || align="left"|Vanderbilt || align="center"|1 || align="center"| || 22 || 319 || 36 || 21 || 115 || 14.5 || 1.6 || 1.0 || 5.2 || align=center|
|-
|align="left"| || align="center"|G || align="left"|Oak Hill Academy (VA) || align="center"|1 || align="center"| || 58 || 1,428 || 152 || 287 || 496 || 24.6 || 2.6 || 4.9 || 8.6 || align=center|
|-
|align="left"| || align="center"|F || align="left"|Ohio State || align="center"|1 || align="center"| || 3 || 10 || 1 || 1 || 6 || 3.3 || 0.3 || 0.3 || 2.0 || align=center|
|-
|align="left"| || align="center"|F || align="left"|Charlotte || align="center"|1 || align="center"| || 5 || 37 || 7 || 0 || 6 || 7.4 || 1.4 || 0.0 || 1.2 || align=center|
|-
|align="left"| || align="center"|F || align="left"|Cincinnati || align="center"|1 || align="center"| || 21 || 287 || 39 || 11 || 113 || 13.7 || 1.9 || 0.5 || 5.4 || align=center|
|-
|align="left"| || align="center"|F || align="left"|UNLV || align="center"|5 || align="center"|– || 330 || 11,050 || 1,821 || 745 || 4,045 || 33.5 || 5.5 || 2.3 || 12.3 || align=center|
|-
|align="left"| || align="center"|F/C || align="left"|Creighton || align="center"|2 || align="center"|– || 94 || 808 || 242 || 71 || 286 || 8.6 || 2.6 || 0.8 || 3.0 || align=center|
|-
|align="left"| || align="center"|G/F || align="left"|Oregon || align="center"|1 || align="center"| || 70 || 1,757 || 170 || 166 || 532 || 25.1 || 2.4 || 2.4 || 7.6 || align=center|
|-
|align="left"| || align="center"|F || align="left"|South Florida || align="center"|1 || align="center"| || 2 || 26 || 3 || 0 || 0 || 13.0 || 1.5 || 0.0 || 0.0 || align=center|
|-
|align="left"| || align="center"|C || align="left"|Texas A&M || align="center"|1 || align="center"| || 19 || 493 || 216 || 57 || 207 || 25.9 || 11.4 || 3.0 || 10.9 || align=center|
|-
|align="left"| || align="center"|C || align="left"|Tulsa || align="center"|1 || align="center"| || 21 || 108 || 27 || 4 || 42 || 5.1 || 1.3 || 0.2 || 2.0 || align=center|
|-
|align="left"| || align="center"|F/C || align="left"|Whitworth || align="center"|4 || align="center"|–– || 128 || 3,285 || 790 || 237 || 1,388 || 25.7 || 6.2 || 1.9 || 10.8 || align=center|
|}

K to L

|-
|align="left"| || align="center"|F || align="left"|Holy Cross || align="center"|2 || align="center"|– || 113 || 955 || 349 || 162 || 622 || 18.4 || 3.1 || 1.4 || 5.5 || align=center|
|-
|align="left"| || align="center"|C || align="left"|Turkey || align="center"|2 || align="center"|– || 115 || 2,958 || 1,241 || 189 || 1,614 || 25.7 || 10.8 || 1.6 || 14.0 || align=center|
|-
|align="left"| || align="center"|G/F || align="left"|NYU || align="center"|1 || align="center"| || 27 ||  ||  || 25 || 194 ||  ||  || 0.9 || 7.2 || align=center|
|-
|align="left" bgcolor="#FFFF99"|^ || align="center"|G || align="left"|California || align="center"|1 || align="center"| || 76 || 2,043 || 323 || 249 || 458 || 26.9 || 4.3 || 3.3 || 6.0 || align=center|
|-
|align="left"| || align="center"|G || align="left"|Loyola Marymount || align="center"|1 || align="center"| || 9 || 55 || 11 || 5 || 33 || 6.1 || 1.2 || 0.6 || 3.7 || align=center|
|-
|align="left" bgcolor="#FFFF99"|^ || align="center"|F || align="left"|Tennessee || align="center"|4 || align="center"|– || 206 || 7,151 || 1,069 || 582 || 5,458 || 34.7 || 5.2 || 2.8 || 26.5 || align=center|
|-
|align="left"| || align="center"|F || align="left"|Duke || align="center"|1 || align="center"| || 5 || 13 || 1 || 0 || 8 || 2.6 || 0.2 || 0.0 || 1.6 || align=center|
|-
|align="left"| || align="center"|C || align="left"|BYU || align="center"|1 || align="center"| || 2 || 16 || 4 || 0 || 0 || 8.0 || 2.0 || 0.0 || 0.0 || align=center|
|-
|align="left"| || align="center"|G/F || align="left"| || align="center"|1 || align="center"| || 2 || 29 || 1 || 8 || 7 || 14.5 || 0.5 || 4.0 || 3.5 || align=center|
|-
|align="left"| || align="center"|F || align="left"|Notre Dame || align="center"|4 || align="center"|– || 283 || 7,331 || 1,444 || 335 || 3,640 || 25.9 || 5.1 || 1.2 || 12.9 || align=center|
|-
|align="left"| || align="center"|C || align="left"|UConn || align="center"|3 || align="center"|– || 126 || 972 || 219 || 27 || 187 || 7.7 || 1.7 || 0.2 || 1.5 || align=center|
|-
|align="left"| || align="center"|C || align="left"|Detroit Mercy || align="center"|3 || align="center"|– || 130 ||  ||  || 206 || 873 ||  ||  || 1.6 || 6.7 || align=center|
|-
|align="left" bgcolor="#CCFFCC"|x || align="center"|F || align="left"|Kentucky || align="center"|2 || align="center"|– || 140 || 3,324 || 519 || 143 || 1,382 || 23.7 || 3.7 || 1.0 || 9.9 || align=center|
|-
|align="left"| || align="center"|G || align="left"|Bowling Green || align="center"|5 || align="center"|– || 335 || 9,768 || 922 || 1,474 || 3,993 || 29.2 || 2.8 || 4.4 || 11.9 || align=center|
|-
|align="left"| || align="center"|F || align="left"|Vanderbilt || align="center"|2 || align="center"|– || 66 || 1,110 || 199 || 80 || 456 || 16.8 || 3.0 || 1.2 || 6.9 || align=center|
|-
|align="left"| || align="center"|G/F || align="left"|NYU || align="center"|1 || align="center"| || 19 || 231 || 41 || 15 || 84 || 12.2 || 2.2 || 0.8 || 4.4 || align=center|
|-
|align="left"| || align="center"|F || align="left"|Notre Dame || align="center"|2 || align="center"|– || 52 ||  ||  || 38 || 253 ||  ||  || 0.7 || 4.9 || align=center|
|-
|align="left"| || align="center"|F || align="left"|Lithuania || align="center"|2 || align="center"|– || 69 || 1,018 || 126 || 69 || 425 || 14.8 || 1.8 || 1.0 || 6.2 || align=center|
|-
|align="left"| || align="center"|F || align="left"|Wisconsin || align="center"|1 || align="center"| || 17 || 108 || 19 || 0 || 44 || 6.4 || 1.1 || 0.0 || 2.6 || align=center|
|-
|align="left"| || align="center"|C || align="left"|Arkansas || align="center"|1 || align="center"| || 19 || 244 || 60 || 3 || 59 || 12.8 || 3.2 || 0.2 || 3.1 || align=center|
|-
|align="left"| || align="center"|G || align="left"|Miami (FL) || align="center"|1 || align="center"| || 76 || 1,865 || 176 || 226 || 470 || 24.5 || 2.3 || 3.0 || 6.2 || align=center|
|-
|align="left"| || align="center"|F || align="left"|Yale || align="center"|1 || align="center"| || 30 ||  || 59 || 23 || 99 ||  || 2.0 || 0.8 || 3.3 || align=center|
|-
|align="left"| || align="center"|G || align="left"|USC || align="center"|1 || align="center"| || 56 || 765 || 47 || 154 || 326 || 13.7 || 0.8 || 2.8 || 5.8 || align=center|
|-
|align="left"| || align="center"|G || align="left"|South Kent School (CT) || align="center"|1 || align="center"| || 12 || 233 || 34 || 18 || 89 || 19.4 || 2.8 || 1.5 || 7.4 || align=center|
|-
|align="left"| || align="center"|G || align="left"|Western Kentucky || align="center"|3 || align="center"|– || 165 || 4,929 || 510 || 375 || 1,804 || 29.9 || 3.1 || 2.3 || 10.9 || align=center|
|-
|align="left" bgcolor="#FFCC00"|+ || align="center"|F || align="left"|Florida || align="center"|5 || align="center"|– || 368 || 11,059 || 3,529 || 711 || 4,775 || 30.1 || 9.6 || 1.9 || 13.0 || align=center|
|-
|align="left"| || align="center"|G || align="left"|Harvard || align="center"|1 || align="center"| || 35 || 940 || 107 || 216 || 512 || 26.9 || 3.1 || 6.2 || 14.6 || align=center|
|-
|align="left"| || align="center"|F/C || align="left"|Iowa || align="center"|1 || align="center"| || 23 || 325 || 31 || 27 || 90 || 14.1 || 1.3 || 1.2 || 3.9 || align=center|
|-
|align="left"| || align="center"|C || align="left"|New Mexico || align="center"|1 || align="center"| || 25 || 301 || 66 || 7 || 49 || 12.0 || 2.6 || 0.3 || 2.0 || align=center|
|-
|align="left"| || align="center"|C || align="left"|Stanford || align="center"|1 || align="center"| || 82 || 2,219 || 602 || 114 || 842 || 27.1 || 7.3 || 1.4 || 10.3 || align=center|
|-
|align="left" bgcolor="#FFFF99"|^ || align="center"|F/C || align="left"|Ohio State || align="center"|3 || align="center"|– || 221 || 6,554 || 1,895 || 865 || 2,442 || 29.7 || 8.6 || 3.9 || 11.0 || align=center|
|-
|align="left"| || align="center"|F/C || align="left"|Marquette || align="center"|1 || align="center"| || 80 || 2,671 || 903 || 179 || 1,263 || 33.4 || 11.3 || 2.2 || 15.8 || align=center|
|-
|align="left"| || align="center"|G || align="left"|NYU || align="center"|5 || align="center"|– || 214 || 1,416 || 272 || 377 || 1,508 || 20.8 || 2.1 || 1.8 || 7.0 || align=center|
|}

M

|-
|align="left"| || align="center"|G/F || align="left"|LSU || align="center"|1 || align="center"| || 8 || 65 || 11 || 3 || 35 || 8.1 || 1.4 || 0.4 || 4.4 || align=center|
|-
|align="left"| || align="center"|G || align="left"|NYU || align="center"|1 || align="center"| || 6 ||  ||  || 0 || 5 ||  ||  || 0.0 || 0.8 || align=center|
|-
|align="left"| || align="center"|G || align="left"|Georgia Tech || align="center"|5 || align="center"|– || 287 || 10,866 || 841 || 2,004 || 5,232 || 37.9 || 2.9 || 7.0 || 18.2 || align=center|
|-
|align="left"| || align="center"|F || align="left"|Georgetown || align="center"|1 || align="center"| || 8 || 68 || 7 || 0 || 25 || 8.5 || 0.9 || 0.0 || 3.1 || align=center|
|-
|align="left"| || align="center"|F || align="left"|Cincinnati || align="center"|2 || align="center"|– || 50 || 1,064 || 229 || 58 || 266 || 21.3 || 4.6 || 1.2 || 5.3 || align=center|
|-
|align="left" bgcolor="#FFFF99"|^ || align="center"|G || align="left"|Texas || align="center"|1 || align="center"| || 13 || 426 || 42 || 39 || 110 || 32.8 || 3.2 || 3.0 || 8.5 || align=center|
|-
|align="left"| || align="center"|G || align="left"|St. Bonaventure || align="center"|1 || align="center"| || 66 || 1,018 || 158 || 115 || 227 || 15.4 || 2.4 || 1.7 || 3.4 || align=center|
|-
|align="left"| || align="center"|F || align="left"|Tennessee State || align="center"|5 || align="center"|– || 395 || 12,536 || 3,054 || 1,030 || 3,893 || 31.7 || 7.7 || 2.6 || 9.9 || align=center|
|-
|align="left"| || align="center"|G || align="left"|Virginia || align="center"|1 || align="center"| || 26 || 319 || 43 || 20 || 75 || 12.3 || 1.7 || 0.8 || 2.9 || align=center|
|-
|align="left"| || align="center"|F/C || align="left"|Temple || align="center"|2 || align="center"|– || 70 || 434 || 129 || 14 || 164 || 6.2 || 1.8 || 0.2 || 2.3 || align=center|
|-
|align="left"| || align="center"|G || align="left"|Marquette || align="center"|1 || align="center"| || 2 || 54 || 3 || 5 || 14 || 27.0 || 1.5 || 2.5 || 7.0 || align=center|
|-
|align="left"| || align="center"|F || align="left"|Dayton || align="center"|2 || align="center"|– || 85 || 798 || 166 || 52 || 300 || 9.4 || 2.0 || 0.6 || 3.5 || align=center|
|-
|align="left"| || align="center"|G || align="left"|Tuskegee || align="center"|1 || align="center"| || 13 || 64 || 8 || 4 || 37 || 4.9 || 0.6 || 0.3 || 2.8 || align=center|
|-
|align="left" bgcolor="#FFFF99"|^ || align="center"|F/C || align="left"|North Carolina || align="center"|3 || align="center"|– || 171 || 6,807 || 2,051 || 566 || 4,560 || bgcolor="#CFECEC"|39.8 || 12.0 || 3.3 || bgcolor="#CFECEC"|26.7 || align=center|
|-
|align="left"| || align="center"|G || align="left"|St. Bonaventure || align="center"|3 || align="center"|– || 41 || 331 || 50 || 65 || 74 || 8.1 || 1.2 || 1.6 || 1.8 || align=center|
|-
|align="left"| || align="center"|F || align="left"|Kentucky || align="center"|1 || align="center"| || 35 || 192 || 23 || 13 || 64 || 5.5 || 0.7 || 0.4 || 1.8 || align=center|
|-
|align="left"| || align="center"|C || align="left"|Michigan || align="center"|1 || align="center"| || 22 || 108 || 34 || 9 || 42 || 4.9 || 1.5 || 0.4 || 1.9 || align=center|
|-
|align="left"| || align="center"|F || align="left"|Wichita State || align="center"|1 || align="center"| || 82 || 2,344 || 460 || 149 || 1,125 || 28.6 || 5.6 || 1.8 || 13.7 || align=center|
|-
|align="left"| || align="center"|F || align="left"|Creighton || align="center"|1 || align="center"| || 55 || 1,172 || 134 || 50 || 395 || 21.3 || 2.4 || 0.9 || 7.2 || align=center|
|-
|align="left"| || align="center"|F/C || align="left"|Alabama || align="center"|1 || align="center"| || 18 || 421 || 119 || 20 || 152 || 23.4 || 6.6 || 1.1 || 8.4 || align=center|
|-
|align="left"| || align="center"|G || align="left"|Arkansas || align="center"|1 || align="center"| || 51 ||  ||  || 51 || 176 ||  ||  || 1.0 || 3.5 || align=center|
|-
|align="left"| || align="center"|F/C || align="left"|Utah || align="center"|1 || align="center"| || 68 || 1,737 || 398 || 121 || 1,085 || 25.5 || 5.9 || 1.8 || 16.0 || align=center|
|-
|align="left" bgcolor="#FFFF99"|^ || align="center"|G/F || align="left"|MZCA (NC) || align="center"|1 || align="center"| || 24 || 627 || 89 || 93 || 226 || 26.1 || 3.7 || 3.9 || 9.4 || align=center|
|-
|align="left" bgcolor="#FFFF99"|^ || align="center"|G/F || align="left"|St. John's || align="center"|3 || align="center"|– || 181 || 2,868 || 409 || 355 || 734 || 15.8 || 2.3 || 2.0 || 4.1 || align=center|
|-
|align="left"| || align="center"|G || align="left"|Marquette || align="center"|1 || align="center"| || 2 || 10 || 2 || 1 || 4 || 5.0 || 1.0 || 0.5 || 2.0 || align=center|
|-
|align="left" bgcolor="#FFFF99"|^ (#15) || align="center"|G || align="left"|St. John's || align="center"|8 || align="center"|– || 530 || 11,330 || 1,944 || 2,950 || 4,228 || 28.5 || 4.2 || 5.6 || 8.0 || align=center|
|-
|align="left"| || align="center"|G || align="left"|SMU || align="center"|1 || align="center"| || 2 || 9 || 1 || 0 || 4 || 4.5 || 0.5 || 0.0 || 2.0 || align=center|
|-
|align="left"| || align="center"|F/C || align="left"|Maryland || align="center"|1 || align="center"| || 56 || 1,222 || 317 || 51 || 528 || 21.8 || 5.7 || 0.9 || 9.4 || align=center|
|-
|align="left"| || align="center"|F || align="left"|Columbia || align="center"|2 || align="center"|– || 148 || 4,135 || 596 || 344 || 1,354 || 27.9 || 4.0 || 2.3 || 9.1 || align=center|
|-
|align="left"| || align="center"|F || align="left"|San Jose State || align="center"|3 || align="center"|– || 108 || 1,864 || 494 || 110 || 466 || 17.3 || 4.6 || 1.0 || 4.3 || align=center|
|-
|align="left"| || align="center"|G || align="left"|Saint Joseph's || align="center"|1 || align="center"| || 75 || 1,387 || 123 || 238 || 437 || 18.5 || 1.6 || 3.2 || 5.8 || align=center|
|-
|align="left"| || align="center"|G || align="left"|Marquette || align="center"|4 || align="center"|– || 268 || 4,959 || 721 || 427 || 1,508 || 18.5 || 2.7 || 1.6 || 5.6 || align=center|
|-
|align="left"| || align="center"|F/C || align="left"|Southern Illinois || align="center"|2 || align="center"|– || 106 || 2,618 || 575 || 114 || 973 || 24.7 || 5.4 || 1.1 || 9.2 || align=center|
|-
|align="left"| || align="center"|G/F || align="left"|Seattle || align="center"|1 || align="center"| || 42 || 198 || 16 || 17 || 62 || 4.7 || 0.4 || 0.4 || 1.5 || align=center|
|-
|align="left"| || align="center"|F/C || align="left"|Serbia || align="center"|1 || align="center"| || 8 || 71 || 18 || 4 || 16 || 8.9 || 2.3 || 0.5 || 2.0 || align=center|
|-
|align="left"| || align="center"|F || align="left"|Cornell || align="center"|1 || align="center"| || 36 ||  ||  || 28 || 144 ||  ||  || 0.8 || 4.0 || align=center|
|-
|align="left"| || align="center"|F || align="left"|Arizona || align="center"|1 || align="center"| || 80 || 2,183 || 408 || 133 || 776 || 27.3 || 5.1 || 1.7 || 9.7 || align=center|
|-
|align="left"| || align="center"|G || align="left"|Utah || align="center"|1 || align="center"| || 3 ||  ||  || 0 || 7 ||  ||  || 0.0 || 2.3 || align=center|
|-
|align="left"| || align="center"|C || align="left"|Kentucky || align="center"|2 || align="center"|– || 81 || 2,192 || 646 || 42 || 836 || 27.1 || 8.0 || 0.5 || 10.3 || align=center|
|-
|align="left"| || align="center"|F || align="left"|Lewis || align="center"|1 || align="center"| || 13 || 75 || 22 || 2 || 45 || 5.8 || 1.7 || 0.2 || 3.5 || align=center|
|-
|align="left" bgcolor="#FFFF99"|^ (#15) || align="center"|G || align="left"|Winston-Salem State || align="center"|9 || align="center"|– || 598 || 17,552 || 1,573 || 2,087 || 9,679 || 29.4 || 2.6 || 3.5 || 16.2 || align=center|
|-
|align="left"| || align="center"|F || align="left"|Kansas || align="center"|1 || align="center"| || 43 || 1,357 || 233 || 59 || 841 || 32.3 || 5.4 || 1.4 || 19.6 || align=center|
|-
|align="left"| || align="center"|C || align="left"|Kentucky || align="center"|2 || align="center"|– || 23 || 225 || 46 || 3 || 60 || 9.8 || 2.0 || 0.1 || 2.6 || align=center|
|-
|align="left"| || align="center"|C || align="left"|Russia || align="center"|1 || align="center"| || 34 || 458 || 104 || 15 || 135 || 13.5 || 3.1 || 0.4 || 4.0 || align=center|
|-
|align="left"| || align="center"|G || align="left"|DR Congo || align="center"|2 || align="center"|– || 81 || 2,100 || 254 || 313 || 1,067 || 25.9 || 3.1 || 3.9 || 13.2 || align=center|
|-
|align="left"| || align="center"|G || align="left"|Fordham || align="center"|1 || align="center"| || 26 ||  ||  || 18 || 76 ||  ||  || 0.7 || 2.9 || align=center|
|-
|align="left"| || align="center"|G || align="left"|Manhattan || align="center"|1 || align="center"| || 24 ||  ||  || 5 || 32 ||  ||  || 0.2 || 1.3 || align=center|
|-
|align="left"| || align="center"|F || align="left"|Simon Gratz HS (PA) || align="center"|1 || align="center"| || 9 ||  ||  || 0 || 24 ||  ||  || 0.0 || 2.7 || align=center|
|-
|align="left"| || align="center"|G/F || align="left"|Wichita State || align="center"|1 || align="center"| || 51 || 373 || 44 || 49 || 140 || 7.3 || 0.9 || 1.0 || 2.7 || align=center|
|-
|align="left"| || align="center"|F/C || align="left"|Maryland || align="center"|1 || align="center"| || 62 || 825 || 169 || 36 || 268 || 13.3 || 2.7 || 0.6 || 4.3 || align=center|
|-
|align="left" bgcolor="#FFFF99"|^ || align="center"|C || align="left"|Georgetown || align="center"|1 || align="center"| || 65 || 1,494 || 437 || 25 || 363 || 23.0 || 6.7 || 0.4 || 5.6 || align=center|
|-
|align="left"| || align="center"|G/F || align="left"|Little Rock || align="center"|3 || align="center"|– || 62 || 478 || 61 || 84 || 141 || 7.7 || 1.0 || 1.4 || 2.3 || align=center|
|}

N to P

|-
|align="left"| || align="center"|F || align="left"|TCU || align="center"|1 || align="center"| || 38 || 405 || 70 || 26 || 210 || 10.7 || 1.8 || 0.7 || 5.5 || align=center|
|-
|align="left" bgcolor="#FFCC00"|+ || align="center"|F/C || align="left"|UCLA || align="center"|7 || align="center"|– || 430 || 14,650 || 5,015 || 826 || 8,318 || 34.1 || 11.7 || 1.9 || 19.3 || align=center|
|-
|align="left"| || align="center"|F || align="left"|Ohio || align="center"|1 || align="center"| || 32 || 331 || 64 || 8 || 98 || 10.3 || 2.0 || 0.3 || 3.1 || align=center|
|-
|align="left"| || align="center"|G/F || align="left"|Utah || align="center"|1 || align="center"| || 76 || 1,507 || 91 || 170 || 705 || 19.8 || 1.2 || 2.2 || 9.3 || align=center|
|-
|align="left"| || align="center"|G/F || align="left"|Richmond || align="center"|3 || align="center"|– || 238 || 6,202 || 556 || 404 || 3,098 || 26.1 || 2.3 || 1.7 || 13.0 || align=center|
|-
|align="left"| || align="center"|F || align="left"|Syracuse || align="center"|1 || align="center"| || 2 || 9 || 2 || 0 || 5 || 4.5 || 1.0 || 0.0 || 2.5 || align=center|
|-
|align="left"| || align="center"|C || align="left"|Florida || align="center"|2 || align="center"|– || 53 || 1,055 || 417 || 107 || 244 || 19.9 || 7.9 || 2.0 || 4.6 || align=center|
|-
|align="left"| || align="center"|F || align="left"|Kentucky || align="center"|3 || align="center"|– || 141 ||  ||  || 103 || 525 ||  ||  || 0.7 || 3.7 || align=center|
|-
|align="left"| || align="center"|C || align="left"|Saint Louis || align="center"|2 || align="center"|– || 33 || 835 || 256 || 40 || 312 || 25.3 || 7.8 || 1.2 || 9.5 || align=center|
|-
|align="left"| || align="center"|G || align="left"|West Florida || align="center"|2 || align="center"|– || 68 || 767 || 77 || 107 || 236 || 11.3 || 1.1 || 1.6 || 3.5 || align=center|
|-
|align="left"| || align="center"|F || align="left"|Marquette || align="center"|2 || align="center"|– || 135 || 2,661 || 256 || 47 || 1,012 || 19.7 || 1.9 || 0.3 || 7.5 || align=center|
|-
|align="left" bgcolor="#CCFFCC"|x || align="center"|G || align="left"|France || align="center"|3 || align="center"|– || 178 || 3,797 || 385 || 543 || 1,066 || 21.3 || 2.2 || 3.1 || 6.0 || align=center|
|-
|align="left" bgcolor="#FFCC00"|+ || align="center"|F/C || align="left"|Virginia Union || align="center"|10 || align="center"|– || 727 || 23,959 || 7,291 || 1,699 || 7,528 || 33.0 || 10.0 || 2.3 || 10.4 || align=center|
|-
|align="left"| || align="center"|C || align="left"|Seattle || align="center"|1 || align="center"| || 44 || 776 || 179 || 19 || 173 || 17.6 || 4.1 || 0.4 || 3.9 || align=center|
|-
|align="left"| || align="center"|F/C || align="left"|Norfolk State || align="center"|3 || align="center"|– || 221 || 3,380 || 1,159 || 347 || 1,355 || 15.3 || 5.2 || 1.6 || 6.1 || align=center|
|-
|align="left"| || align="center"|F || align="left"|Syracuse || align="center"|6 || align="center"|– || 407 || 9,615 || 1,425 || 587 || 3,768 || 23.6 || 3.5 || 1.4 || 9.3 || align=center|
|-
|align="left"| || align="center"|G/F || align="left"|UNLV || align="center"|1 || align="center"| || 3 || 8 || 0 || 0 || 4 || 2.7 || 0.0 || 0.0 || 1.3 || align=center|
|-
|align="left"| || align="center"|F/C || align="left"|Princeton || align="center"|3 || align="center"|– || 148 ||  ||  || 187 || 1,737 ||  ||  || 1.3 || 11.7 || align=center|
|-
|align="left"| || align="center"|F/C || align="left"|Dayton || align="center"|2 || align="center"|– || 109 || 1,770 || 457 || 83 || 724 || 16.2 || 4.2 || 0.8 || 6.6 || align=center|
|-
|align="left"| || align="center"|F/C || align="left"|Northeastern State || align="center"|1 || align="center"| || 28 || 151 || 49 || 7 || 40 || 5.4 || 1.8 || 0.3 || 1.4 || align=center|
|-
|align="left" bgcolor="#CCFFCC"|x || align="center"|G || align="left"|Louisiana  || align="center"|1 || align="center"||| 45 || 1,246 || 212 || 323 || 449 || 27.6 || 4.7 || 7.2 || 10.0 || align=center|
|-
|align="left"| || align="center"|F || align="left"|Oregon || align="center"|2 || align="center"|– || 95 || 1,282 || 377 || 75 || 464 || 13.5 || 4.0 || 0.8 || 4.9 || align=center|
|-
|align="left"| || align="center"|C || align="left"|Duke || align="center"|1 || align="center"| || 21 || 170 || 51 || 10 || 40 || 8.1 || 2.4 || 0.5 || 1.9 || align=center|
|-
|align="left"| || align="center"|F/C || align="left"|Whitworth || align="center"|1 || align="center"| || 3 || 37 || 8 || 2 || 10 || 12.3 || 2.7 || 0.7 || 3.3 || align=center|
|-
|align="left"| || align="center"|F/C || align="left"|Villanova || align="center"|1 || align="center"| || 17 || 133 || 38 || 2 || 33 || 7.8 || 2.2 || 0.1 || 1.9 || align=center|
|-
|align="left" bgcolor="#CCFFCC"|x || align="center"|G || align="left"|Arkansas  || align="center"|1 || align="center"| || 66 || 1,393 || 338 || 98 || 668 || 21.1 || 5.1 || 1.5 || 10.1 || align=center|
|-
|align="left" bgcolor="#FFCC00"|+ || align="center"|F/C || align="left"|Latvia || align="center"|3 || align="center"|– || 186 || 5,764 || 1,317 || 248 || 3,312 || 31.0 || 7.1 || 1.3 || 17.8 || align=center|
|-
|align="left"| || align="center"|G || align="left"|St. John's || align="center"|3 || align="center"|– || 61 || 446 || 45 || 13 || 195 || 7.3 || 0.7 || 0.2 || 3.2 || align=center|
|-
|align="left"| || align="center"|G || align="left"|Illinois || align="center"|2 || align="center"|– || 62 || 291 || 35 || 18 || 103 || 4.7 || 0.6 || 0.3 || 1.7 || align=center|
|-
|align="left"| || align="center"|G || align="left"|Argentina || align="center"|3 || align="center"|– || 187 || 3,341 || 352 || 568 || 728 || 17.9 || 1.9 || 3.0 || 3.9 || align=center|
|}

Q to R

|-
|align="left"| || align="center"|F || align="left"|Washington State || align="center"|3 || align="center"|– || 123 || 1,394 || 197 || 71 || 433 || 11.3 || 1.6 || 0.6 || 3.5 || align=center|
|-
|align="left"| || align="center"|C || align="left"|Xavier || align="center"|2 || align="center"|– || 63 || 620 || 188 || 18 || 233 || 9.8 || 3.0 || 0.3 || 3.7 || align=center|
|-
|align="left"| || align="center"|G || align="left"|Villanova || align="center"|1 || align="center"| || 6 || 63 || 8 || 6 || 9 || 10.5 || 1.3 || 1.0 || 1.5 || align=center|
|-
|align="left"| || align="center"|F || align="left"|NYU || align="center"|1 || align="center"| || 7 || 160 || 47 || 9 || 80 || 22.9 || 6.7 || 1.3 || 11.4 || align=center|
|-
|align="left"| || align="center"|G || align="left"|Stanford || align="center"|1 || align="center"| || 18 || 225 || 27 || 28 || 95 || 12.5 || 1.5 || 1.6 || 5.3 || align=center|
|-
|align="left" bgcolor="#CCFFCC"|x || align="center"|F || align="left"|Kentucky || align="center"|1 || align="center"|  || 64 || 2,080 || 622 || 198 || 1,248 || 32.5 || 9.7 || 3.1 || 19.5 || align=center|
|-
|align="left"| || align="center"|F || align="left"|LSU || align="center"|1 || align="center"| || 17 || 127 || 40 || 7 || 35 || 7.5 || 2.4 || 0.4 || 2.1 || align=center|
|-
|align="left"| || align="center"|F/C || align="left"|Michigan State || align="center"|2 || align="center"|– || 80 || 2,632 || 847 || 155 || 1,443 || 32.9 || 10.6 || 1.9 || 18.0 || align=center|
|-
|align="left"| || align="center"|G || align="left"|Syracuse || align="center"|1 || align="center"| || 5 || 24 || 1 || 3 || 8 || 4.8 || 0.2 || 0.6 || 1.6 || align=center|
|-
|align="left" bgcolor="#FFFF99"|^ (#19) || align="center"|F/C || align="left"|Grambling State || align="center"|10 || align="center"|– || 650 || 23,073 || 8,414 || 1,186 || 12,183 || 35.5 || 12.9 || 1.8 || 18.7 || align=center|
|-
|align="left"| || align="center"|F || align="left"|North Carolina || align="center"|1 || align="center"| || 33 || 670 || 132 || 28 || 219 || 20.3 || 4.0 || 0.8 || 6.6 || align=center|
|-
|align="left"| || align="center"|F || align="left"|Michigan || align="center"|1 || align="center"| || 75 || 2,212 || 307 || 89 || 899 || 29.5 || 4.1 || 1.2 || 12.0 || align=center|
|-
|align="left" bgcolor="#FFCC00"|+ || align="center"|G/F || align="left"|Montana || align="center"|4 || align="center"|– || 315 || 10,497 || 1,882 || 2,244 || 4,485 || 33.3 || 6.0 || 7.1 || 14.2 || align=center|
|-
|align="left"| || align="center"|G || align="left"|DePaul || align="center"|5 || align="center"|– || 242 || 6,827 || 1,226 || 430 || 2,352 || 28.2 || 5.1 || 1.8 || 9.7 || align=center|
|-
|align="left"| || align="center"|F/C || align="left"|South Carolina || align="center"|3 || align="center"|– || 82 || 605 || 138 || 24 || 225 || 7.4 || 1.7 || 0.3 || 2.7 || align=center|
|-
|align="left"| || align="center"|G/F || align="left"|Providence || align="center"|4 || align="center"|– || 221 || 3,427 || 421 || 370 || 1,149 || 15.5 || 1.9 || 1.7 || 5.2 || align=center|
|-
|align="left"| || align="center"|G/F || align="left"|Eastern Kentucky || align="center"|3 || align="center"|– || 151 ||  || 65 || 145 || 789 ||  || 1.9 || 1.0 || 5.2 || align=center|
|-
|align="left"| || align="center"|G || align="left"|Marquette || align="center"|3 || align="center"|– || 99 || 2,432 || 240 || 513 || 766 || 24.6 || 2.4 || 5.2 || 7.7 || align=center|
|-
|align="left"| || align="center"|G || align="left"|Florida || align="center"|1 || align="center"| || 23 || 253 || 15 || 19 || 107 || 11.0 || 0.7 || 0.8 || 4.7 || align=center|
|-
|align="left"| || align="center"|G/F || align="left"|Centenary || align="center"|1 || align="center"| || 2 || 10 || 2 || 0 || 3 || 5.0 || 1.0 || 0.0 || 1.5 || align=center|
|-
|align="left" bgcolor="#CCFFCC"|x || align="center"|C || align="left"|Chalmette HS (LS) || align="center"|2 || align="center"|–  || 123 || 2,672 || 827 || 73 || 1,024 || 21.7 || 6.7 || 0.6 || 8.3 || align=center|
|-
|align="left"| || align="center"|G || align="left"|Washington || align="center"|5 || align="center"|– || 312 || 7,725 || 903 || 862 || 3,897 || 24.8 || 2.9 || 2.8 || 12.5 || align=center|
|-
|align="left"| || align="center"|F/C || align="left"|Tennessee State || align="center"|3 || align="center"|– || 148 || 4,596 || 1,211 || 242 || 1,475 || 31.1 || 8.2 || 1.6 || 10.0 || align=center|
|-
|align="left"| || align="center"|G || align="left"|Spain || align="center"|1 || align="center"| || 27 || 531 || 39 || 91 || 200 || 19.7 || 1.4 || 3.4 || 7.4 || align=center|
|-
|align="left"| || align="center"|G || align="left"|Louisville || align="center"|1 || align="center"| || 40 || 659 || 85 || 101 || 233 || 16.5 || 2.1 || 2.5 || 5.8 || align=center|
|-
|align="left"| || align="center"|G || align="left"|Memphis || align="center"|1 || align="center"| || 64 || 2,082 || 246 || 283 || 1,154 || 32.5 || 3.8 || 4.4 || 18.0 || align=center|
|-
|align="left"| || align="center"|G/F || align="left"|Michigan || align="center"|1 || align="center"| || 26 || 747 || 82 || 68 || 330 || 28.7 || 3.2 || 2.6 || 12.7 || align=center|
|-
|align="left"| || align="center"|F || align="left"|Drexel || align="center"|5 || align="center"|– || 230 || 3,196 || 682 || 188 || 928 || 13.9 || 3.0 || 0.8 || 4.0 || align=center|
|-
|align="left"| || align="center"|F || align="left"|CCNY || align="center"|1 || align="center"| || 31 ||  ||  || 19 || 133 ||  ||  || 0.6 || 4.3 || align=center|
|-
|align="left"| || align="center"|C || align="left"|LIU Brooklyn || align="center"|1 || align="center"| || 53 ||  ||  || 68 || 314 ||  ||  || 1.3 || 5.9 || align=center|
|-
|align="left"| || align="center"|F || align="left"|McNeese State || align="center"|1 || align="center"| || 58 || 723 || 167 || 35 || 184 || 12.5 || 2.9 || 0.6 || 3.2 || align=center|
|-
|align="left"| || align="center"|F || align="left"|USC || align="center"|3 || align="center"|– || 109 || 1,290 || 320 || 56 || 690 || 11.8 || 2.9 || 0.5 || 6.3 || align=center|
|-
|align="left"| || align="center"|F || align="left"|Michigan || align="center"|2 || align="center"|– || 156 || 5,223 || 589 || 541 || 2,365 || 33.5 || 3.8 || 3.5 || 15.2 || align=center|
|-
|align="left"| || align="center"|G/F || align="left"|Michigan || align="center"|5 || align="center"|– || 344 || 8,256 || 1,262 || 709 || 4,584 || 24.0 || 3.7 || 2.1 || 13.3 || align=center|
|}

S

|-
|align="left"| || align="center"|C || align="left"|Senegal || align="center"|1 || align="center"| || 2 || 8 || 2 || 0 || 0 || 4.0 || 1.0 || 0.0 || 0.0 || align=center|
|-
|align="left"| || align="center"|F || align="left"|Iona || align="center"|1 || align="center"| || 4 || 23 || 3 || 1 || 11 || 5.8 || 0.8 || 0.3 || 2.8 || align=center|
|-
|align="left"| || align="center"|F || align="left"|LSU || align="center"|2 || align="center"|– || 47 || 508 || 137 || 10 || 218 || 10.8 || 2.9 || 0.2 || 4.6 || align=center|
|-
|align="left"| || align="center"|F || align="left"|West Virginia || align="center"|1 || align="center"| || 44 || 1,243 || 217 || 88 || 387 || 28.3 || 4.9 || 2.0 || 8.8 || align=center|
|-
|align="left"| || align="center"|G || align="left"|LIU Brooklyn || align="center"|1 || align="center"| || 54 ||  ||  || 109 || 435 ||  ||  || 2.0 || 8.1 || align=center|
|-
|align="left"| || align="center"|C || align="left"|LIU Brooklyn || align="center"|1 || align="center"| || 12 || 167 || 26 || 6 || 47 || 13.9 || 2.2 || 0.5 || 3.9 || align=center|
|-
|align="left"| || align="center"|F || align="left"|Georgia Tech || align="center"|1 || align="center"| || 15 || 206 || 20 || 8 || 43 || 13.7 || 1.3 || 0.5 || 2.9 || align=center|
|-
|align="left"| || align="center"|F || align="left"|LIU Brooklyn || align="center"|1 || align="center"| || 4 || 8 || 3 || 1 || 2 || 2.0 || 0.8 || 0.3 || 0.5 || align=center|
|-
|align="left" bgcolor="#FFCC00"|+ || align="center"|F || align="left"|Santa Clara || align="center"|7 || align="center"|– || 424 || 13,622 || 3,909 || 746 || 6,854 || 32.1 || 9.2 || 1.8 || 16.2 || align=center|
|-
|align="left"| || align="center"|G/F || align="left"|Furman || align="center"|1 || align="center"| || 68 || 1,448 || 248 || 96 || 667 || 21.3 || 3.6 || 1.4 || 9.8 || align=center|
|-
|align="left"| || align="center"|F/C || align="left"|Senegal || align="center"|1 || align="center"| || 1 || 6 || 5 || 0 || 3 || 6.0 || 5.0 || 0.0 || 3.0 || align=center|
|-
|align="left"| || align="center"|F || align="left"|France || align="center"|1 || align="center"| || 48 || 526 || 126 || 47 || 187 || 11.0 || 2.6 || 1.0 || 3.9 || align=center|
|-
|align="left"| || align="center"|G || align="left"|Nevada || align="center"|1 || align="center"| || 13 || 167 || 18 || 27 || 48 || 12.8 || 1.4 || 2.1 || 3.7 || align=center|
|-
|align="left"| || align="center"|F || align="left"|NC State || align="center"|2 || align="center"|– || 8 || 74 || 23 || 0 || 10 || 9.3 || 2.9 || 0.0 || 1.3 || align=center|
|-
|align="left"| || align="center"|F/C || align="left"|Oregon State || align="center"|2 || align="center"|– || 164 || 4,423 || 1,213 || 344 || 2,174 || 27.0 || 7.4 || 2.1 || 13.3 || align=center|
|-
|align="left"| || align="center"|G || align="left"|VCU || align="center"|1 || align="center"| || 64 || 1,624 || 149 || 311 || 395 || 25.4 || 2.3 || 4.9 || 6.2 || align=center|
|-
|align="left"| || align="center"|F || align="left"|Jackson State || align="center"|1 || align="center"| || 27 || 185 || 41 || 8 || 71 || 6.9 || 1.5 || 0.3 || 2.6 || align=center|
|-
|align="left"| || align="center"|G || align="left"|Ohio || align="center"|1 || align="center"| || 4 ||  ||  || 2 || 1 ||  ||  || 0.5 || 0.3 || align=center|
|-
|align="left"| || align="center"|G || align="left"|Maryland || align="center"|3 || align="center"|– || 206 || 4,920 || 547 || 516 || 1,825 || 23.9 || 2.7 || 2.5 || 8.9 || align=center|
|-
|align="left"| || align="center"|G || align="left"|Georgia Tech || align="center"|4 || align="center"|– || 202 || 5,288 || 711 || 446 || 1,587 || 26.2 || 3.5 || 2.2 || 7.9 || align=center|
|-
|align="left"| || align="center"|G || align="left"|Russia || align="center"|1 || align="center"| || 16 || 423 || 73 || 57 || 236 || 26.4 || 4.6 || 3.6 || 14.8 || align=center|
|-
|align="left"| || align="center"|F/C || align="left"|Flushing HS (NY) || align="center"|5 || align="center"|– || 329 || 5,271 || 1,839 || 595 || 3,362 || 26.0 || 6.8 || 1.8 || 10.2 || align=center|
|-
|align="left"| || align="center"|C || align="left"|Michigan || align="center"|1 || align="center"| || 1 || 11 || 4 || 0 || 6 || 11.0 || 4.0 || 0.0 || 6.0 || align=center|
|-
|align="left"| || align="center"|G || align="left"|UAB || align="center"|1 || align="center"| || 2 || 10 || 0 || 1 || 4 || 5.0 || 0.0 || 0.5 || 2.0 || align=center|
|-
|align="left"| || align="center"|G/F || align="left"|Saint Peter's || align="center"|1 || align="center"| || 9 || 83 || 16 || 7 || 23 || 9.2 || 1.8 || 0.8 || 2.6 || align=center|
|-
|align="left"| || align="center"|F/C || align="left"|Pittsburgh || align="center"|4 || align="center"|– || 241 || 6,317 || 1,081 || 341 || 2,719 || 26.2 || 4.5 || 1.4 || 11.3 || align=center|
|-
|align="left"| || align="center"|G || align="left"|Louisville || align="center"|1 || align="center"| || 2 || 2 || 0 || 0 || 0 || 1.0 || 0.0 || 0.0 || 0.0 || align=center|
|-
|align="left" bgcolor="#CCFFCC"|x || align="center"|G || align="left"|NC State || align="center"|2 || align="center"|– || 55 || 1,137 || 136 || 212 || 495 || 20.7 || 2.5 || 3.9 || 9.0 || align=center|
|-
|align="left"| || align="center"|F || align="left"|Harvard || align="center"|1 || align="center"| || 12 || 127 || 32 || 10 || 35 || 10.6 || 2.7 || 0.8 || 2.9 || align=center|
|-
|align="left"| || align="center"|G/F || align="left"|Saint Benedict's Prep. (NJ) || align="center"|4 || align="center"|– || 213 || 6,685 || 915 || 602 || 3,214 || 31.4 || 4.3 || 2.8 || 15.1 || align=center|
|-
|align="left"| || align="center"|F/C || align="left"|Colorado State || align="center"|1 || align="center"| || 82 || 1,785 || 324 || 140 || 656 || 21.8 || 4.0 || 1.7 || 8.0 || align=center|
|-
|align="left"| || align="center"|G/F || align="left"|Buffalo State || align="center"|1 || align="center"| || 82 || 2,033 || 155 || 255 || 821 || 24.8 || 1.9 || 3.1 || 10.0 || align=center|
|-
|align="left"| || align="center"|F || align="left"|Niagara || align="center"|1 || align="center"| || 8 || 59 || 10 || 2 || 15 || 7.4 || 1.3 || 0.3 || 1.9 || align=center|
|-
|align="left"| || align="center"|G || align="left"|DePaul || align="center"|4 || align="center"|– || 191 || 3,855 || 789 || 351 || 1,617 || 20.2 || 4.1 || 1.8 || 8.5 || align=center|
|-
|align="left"| || align="center"|F || align="left"|Detroit Mercy || align="center"|2 || align="center"|– || 116 || 2,268 || 648 || 114 || 1,050 || 19.6 || 5.6 || 1.0 || 9.1 || align=center|
|-
|align="left"| || align="center"|G || align="left"|Villanova || align="center"|6 || align="center"|– || 347 || 9,955 || 734 || 2,164 || 3,334 || 28.7 || 2.1 || 6.2 || 9.6 || align=center|
|-
|align="left"| || align="center"|C || align="left"|Louisville || align="center"|2 || align="center"|– || 50 || 361 || 85 || 5 || 68 || 7.2 || 1.7 || 0.1 || 1.4 || align=center|
|-
|align="left"| || align="center"|C || align="left"|Western Kentucky || align="center"|1 || align="center"| || 17 || 207 || 51 || 6 || 67 || 12.2 || 3.0 || 0.4 || 3.9 || align=center|
|-
|align="left" bgcolor="#FFCC00"|+ || align="center"|G || align="left"|Alabama || align="center"|5 || align="center"|– || 351 || 13,711 || 1,435 || 1,337 || 6,284 || 39.1 || 4.1 || 3.8 || 17.9 || align=center|
|-
|align="left"| || align="center"|F/C || align="left"|Wichita State || align="center"|6 || align="center"|–– || 340 || 7,004 || 1,694 || 602 || 3,496 || 20.6 || 5.0 || 1.8 || 10.3 || align=center|
|-
|align="left"| || align="center"|G || align="left"|Oklahoma State || align="center"|8 || align="center"|– || 602 || 17,271 || 1,602 || 2,394 || 8,489 || 28.7 || 2.7 || 4.0 || 14.1 || align=center|
|-
|align="left"| || align="center"|G || align="left"|St. Bonaventure || align="center"|1 || align="center"| || 32 || 440 || 51 || 60 || 141 || 13.8 || 1.6 || 1.9 || 4.4 || align=center|
|-
|align="left"| || align="center"|F || align="left"|St. Bonaventure || align="center"|1 || align="center"| || 25 || 209 || 39 || 18 || 77 || 8.4 || 1.6 || 0.7 || 3.1 || align=center|
|-
|align="left" bgcolor="#FFCC00"|+ || align="center"|F/C || align="left"|Cypress Creek HS (FL) || align="center"|5 || align="center"|– || 255 || 7,426 || 1,713 || 338 || 4,411 || 29.1 || 6.7 || 1.3 || 17.3 || align=center|
|-
|align="left"| || align="center"|G || align="left"|Nebraska || align="center"|1 || align="center"| || 28 || 421 || 52 || 29 || 120 || 15.0 || 1.9 || 1.0 || 4.3 || align=center|
|-
|align="left"| || align="center"|G || align="left"|DePaul || align="center"|2 || align="center"|– || 132 || 2,377 || 286 || 538 || 1,150 || 18.0 || 2.2 || 4.1 || 8.7 || align=center|
|-
|align="left"| || align="center"|G/F || align="left"|Rhode Island || align="center"|2 || align="center"|– || 107 ||  ||  || 106 || 808 ||  ||  || 1.0 || 7.6 || align=center|
|-
|align="left"| || align="center"|C || align="left"|Croatia || align="center"|2 || align="center"|– || 22 || 77 || 13 || 3 || 27 || 3.5 || 0.6 || 0.1 || 1.2 || align=center|
|-
|align="left"| || align="center"|F || align="left"|LIU Brooklyn || align="center"|1 || align="center"| || 26 || 187 || 25 || 9 || 45 || 7.2 || 1.0 || 0.3 || 1.7 || align=center|
|-
|align="left"| || align="center"|F || align="left"|Georgetown || align="center"|2 || align="center"|– || 119 || 2,003 || 575 || 58 || 830 || 16.8 || 4.8 || 0.5 || 7.0 || align=center|
|}

T to U

|-
|align="left"| || align="center"|G || align="left"|NYU || align="center"|2 || align="center"|– || 56 ||  ||  || 108 || 499 ||  ||  || 1.9 || 8.9 || align=center|
|-
|align="left"| || align="center"|F || align="left"|Michigan || align="center"|2 || align="center"|– || 94 || 1,641 || 322 || 67 || 598 || 17.5 || 3.4 || 0.7 || 6.4 || align=center|
|-
|align="left"| || align="center"|G/F || align="left"|Duke || align="center"|1 || align="center"| || 31 || 321 || 36 || 41 || 95 || 10.4 || 1.2 || 1.3 || 3.1 || align=center|
|-
|align="left"| || align="center"|F || align="left"|TCU || align="center"|8 || align="center"|– || 569 || 16,421 || 4,272 || 779 || 6,027 || 28.9 || 7.5 || 1.4 || 10.6 || align=center|
|-
|align="left"| || align="center"|F || align="left"|Duke || align="center"|5 || align="center"|– || 264 || 5,457 || 685 || 208 || 1,592 || 20.7 || 2.6 || 0.8 || 6.0 || align=center|
|-
|align="left"| || align="center"|F || align="left"|Villanova || align="center"|3 || align="center"|– || 131 || 3,459 || 465 || 190 || 1,574 || 26.4 || 3.5 || 1.5 || 12.0 || align=center|
|-
|align="left"| || align="center"|G || align="left"|Oklahoma State || align="center"|1 || align="center"| || 17 || 121 || 10 || 24 || 33 || 7.1 || 0.6 || 1.4 || 1.9 || align=center|
|-
|align="left"| || align="center"|F/C || align="left"|UC Irvine || align="center"|3 || align="center"|– || 111 || 1,690 || 359 || 55 || 424 || 15.2 || 3.2 || 0.5 || 3.8 || align=center|
|-
|align="left"| || align="center"|F || align="left"|Indiana || align="center"|1 || align="center"| || 11 || 177 || 35 || 5 || 47 || 16.1 || 3.2 || 0.5 || 4.3 || align=center|
|-
|align="left"| || align="center"|G || align="left"|Dayton || align="center"|1 || align="center"| || 21 || 139 || 8 || 24 || 57 || 6.6 || 0.4 || 1.1 || 2.7 || align=center|
|-
|align="left" bgcolor="#CCFFCC"|x || align="center"|G || align="left"|Arizona || align="center"|2 || align="center"|– || 88 || 1,750 || 226 || 147 || 850 || 19.9 || 2.6 || 1.7 || 9.7 || align=center|
|-
|align="left"| || align="center"|C || align="left"|Poland || align="center"|1 || align="center"| || 3 || 5 || 0 || 0 || 1 || 1.7 || 0.0 || 0.0 || 0.3 || align=center|
|-
|align="left"| || align="center"|G || align="left"|Minnesota || align="center"|9 || align="center"|– || 663 || 14,347 || 1,412 || 1,423 || 5,725 || 21.6 || 2.1 || 2.1 || 8.6 || align=center|
|-
|align="left"| || align="center"|F || align="left"|Gonzaga || align="center"|1 || align="center"| || 64 || 1,141 || 207 || 92 || 267 || 17.8 || 3.2 || 1.4 || 4.2 || align=center|
|-
|align="left"| || align="center"|F || align="left"|Turkey || align="center"|1 || align="center"| || 7 || 25 || 10 || 1 || 4 || 3.6 || 1.4 || 0.1 || 0.6 || align=center|
|-
|align="left"| || align="center"|G/F || align="left"|Western Kentucky || align="center"|1 || align="center"| || 65 || 922 || 154 || 77 || 282 || 14.2 || 2.4 || 1.2 || 4.3 || align=center|
|-
|align="left"| || align="center"|C || align="left"|San Diego HS (CA) || align="center"|1 || align="center"| || 41 || 398 || 109 || 8 || 146 || 9.7 || 2.7 || 0.2 || 3.6 || align=center|
|-
|align="left"| || align="center"|F/C || align="left"|Louisville || align="center"|4 || align="center"|– || 270 || 6,205 || 1,957 || 229 || 2,572 || 23.0 || 7.2 || 0.8 || 9.5 || align=center|
|-
|align="left"| || align="center"|F || align="left"|Portland State || align="center"|1 || align="center"| || 8 || 114 || 17 || 6 || 22 || 14.3 || 2.1 || 0.8 || 2.8 || align=center|
|-
|align="left"| || align="center"|G || align="left"|Slovenia || align="center"|1 || align="center"| || 31 || 588 || 57 || 110 || 173 || 19.0 || 1.8 || 3.5 || 5.6 || align=center|
|}

V to Z

|-
|align="left"| || align="center"|G/F || align="left"|Indiana || align="center"|3 || align="center"|– || 236 || 7,529 || 1,355 || 661 || 3,019 || 31.9 || 5.7 || 2.8 || 12.8 || align=center|
|-
|align="left"| || align="center"|G/F || align="left"|NYU || align="center"|4 || align="center"|– || 175 ||  ||  || 256 || 826 ||  ||  || 1.5 || 4.7 || align=center|
|-
|align="left"| || align="center"|F || align="left"|Utah || align="center"|1 || align="center"| || 47 || 1,574 || 343 || 83 || 769 || 33.5 || 7.3 || 1.8 || 16.4 || align=center|
|-
|align="left"| || align="center"|G/F || align="left"|Colgate || align="center"|6 || align="center"|– || 224 || 3,600 || 834 || 548 || 2,135 || 26.1 || 4.6 || 2.4 || 9.5 || align=center|
|-
|align="left"| || align="center"|F || align="left"|UCLA || align="center"|4 || align="center"|– || 191 || 4,441 || 357 || 243 || 2,199 || 23.3 || 1.9 || 1.3 || 11.5 || align=center|
|-
|align="left"| || align="center"|F || align="left"|Indiana || align="center"|1 || align="center"| || 68 || 1,722 || 528 || 129 || 571 || 25.3 || 7.8 || 1.9 || 8.4 || align=center|
|-
|align="left"| || align="center"|G || align="left"|Slovenia || align="center"|2 || align="center"|– || 103 || 1,316 || 208 || 136 || 420 || 12.8 || 2.0 || 1.3 || 4.1 || align=center|
|-
|align="left"| || align="center"|C || align="left"|Florida || align="center"|3 || align="center"|– || 123 || 1,749 || 493 || 147 || 781 || 14.2 || 4.0 || 1.2 || 6.3 || align=center|
|-
|align="left"| || align="center"|F || align="left"|Kansas State || align="center"|3 || align="center"|– || 120 || 2,143 || 285 || 108 || 808 || 17.9 || 2.4 || 0.9 || 6.7 || align=center|
|-
|align="left"| || align="center"|G || align="left"|Arkansas || align="center"|3 || align="center"|– || 245 || 5,836 || 665 || 1,029 || 2,585 || 23.8 || 2.7 || 4.2 || 10.6 || align=center|
|-
|align="left"| || align="center"|F || align="left"|Kentucky || align="center"|5 || align="center"|– || 351 || 7,387 || 1,457 || 259 || 2,720 || 21.0 || 4.2 || 0.7 || 7.7 || align=center|
|-
|align="left"| || align="center"|F || align="left"|Syracuse || align="center"|2 || align="center"| || 128 || 1,585 || 290 || 59 || 717 || 12.4 || 2.3 || 0.5 || 5.6 || align=center|
|-
|align="left"| || align="center"|F/C || align="left"|North Carolina || align="center"|1 || align="center"| || 21 || 296 || 83 || 6 || 146 || 14.1 || 4.0 || 0.3 || 7.0 || align=center|
|-
|align="left"| || align="center"|G || align="left"|Florida State || align="center"|10 || align="center"|– || 580 || 13,295 || 1,561 || 2,451 || 3,753 || 22.9 || 2.7 || 4.2 || 6.5 || align=center|
|-
|align="left"| || align="center"|G/F || align="left"|St. John's || align="center"|1 || align="center"| || 44 || 272 || 40 || 30 || 112 || 6.2 || 0.9 || 0.7 || 2.5 || align=center|
|-
|align="left"| || align="center"|F || align="left"|UCLA || align="center"|1 || align="center"| || 51 || 672 || 106 || 40 || 199 || 13.2 || 2.1 || 0.8 || 3.9 || align=center|
|-
|align="left"| || align="center"|F || align="left"|Southern Miss || align="center"|3 || align="center"|– || 150 || 3,968 || 1,109 || 141 || 1,069 || 26.5 || 7.4 || 0.9 || 7.1 || align=center|
|-
|align="left"| || align="center"|C || align="left"|Purdue || align="center"|1 || align="center"| || 11 ||  ||  || 1 || 20 ||  ||  || 0.1 || 1.8 || align=center|
|-
|align="left"| || align="center"|C || align="left"|Morgan State || align="center"|6 || align="center"|– || 402 || 8,678 || 2,499 || 454 || 2,427 || 21.6 || 6.2 || 1.1 || 6.0 || align=center|
|-
|align="left" bgcolor="#FFFF99"|^ || align="center"|G || align="left"|USC || align="center"|2 || align="center"|– || 98 || 2,429 || 137 || 539 || 1,008 || 24.8 || 1.4 || 5.5 || 10.3 || align=center|
|-
|align="left"| || align="center"|G/F || align="left"|Cincinnati || align="center"|1 || align="center"| || 57 || 435 || 48 || 29 || 125 || 7.6 || 0.8 || 0.5 || 2.2 || align=center|
|-
|align="left"| || align="center"|G || align="left"|Tennessee || align="center"|1 || align="center"| || 12 || 117 || 3 || 10 || 43 || 9.8 || 0.3 || 0.8 || 3.6 || align=center|
|-
|align="left"| || align="center"|F || align="left"|Maryland || align="center"|1 || align="center"| || 25 || 330 || 82 || 14 || 135 || 13.2 || 3.3 || 0.6 || 5.4 || align=center|
|-
|align="left"| || align="center"|F/C || align="left"|Gardner-Webb || align="center"|5 || align="center"|– || 296 || 3,595 || 962 || 60 || 1,376 || 12.1 || 3.3 || 0.2 || 4.6 || align=center|
|-
|align="left"| || align="center"|G/F || align="left"|Chattanooga || align="center"|7 || align="center"|– || 555 || 17,017 || 1,800 || 1,939 || 8,258 || 30.7 || 3.2 || 3.5 || 14.9 || align=center|
|-
|align="left"| || align="center"|F/C || align="left"|Maryland || align="center"|2 || align="center"|– || 115 || 2,234 || 580 || 74 || 667 || 19.4 || 5.0 || 0.6 || 5.8 || align=center|
|-
|align="left"| || align="center"|F || align="left"|Arizona || align="center"|1 || align="center"| || 80 || 1,435 || 296 || 75 || 746 || 17.9 || 3.7 || 0.9 || 9.3 || align=center|
|-
|align="left"| || align="center"|G || align="left"|Illinois || align="center"|2 || align="center"|– || 77 || 881 || 71 || 155 || 247 || 11.4 || 0.9 || 2.0 || 3.2 || align=center|
|-
|align="left"| || align="center"|F/C || align="left"|Ohio State || align="center"|7 || align="center"|– || 278 || 3,024 || 608 || 110 || 796 || 10.9 || 2.2 || 0.4 || 2.9 || align=center|
|-
|align="left"| || align="center"|F || align="left"|Georgetown || align="center"|1 || align="center"| || 79 || 1,211 || 283 || 41 || 359 || 15.3 || 3.6 || 0.5 || 4.5 || align=center|
|-
|align="left"| || align="center"|G || align="left"|Lincoln (MO) || align="center"|1 || align="center"| || 5 || 13 || 0 || 2 || 4 || 2.6 || 0.0 || 0.4 || 0.8 || align=center|
|-
|align="left"| || align="center"|F || align="left"|Notre Dame || align="center"|2 || align="center"|– || 55 || 565 || 115 || 53 || 156 || 10.3 || 2.1 || 1.0 || 2.8 || align=center|
|-
|align="left"| || align="center"|G || align="left"|Minnesota || align="center"|5 || align="center"|– || 399 || 11,474 || 1,500 || 2,260 || 6,555 || 28.8 || 3.8 || 5.7 || 16.4 || align=center|
|-
|align="left"| || align="center"|F || align="left"|Memphis || align="center"|1 || align="center"| || 64 || 1,323 || 239 || 47 || 454 || 20.7 || 3.7 || 0.7 || 7.1 || align=center|
|-
|align="left"| || align="center"|F || align="left"|Duke || align="center"|1 || align="center"| || 17 || 198 || 50 || 13 || 66 || 11.6 || 2.9 || 0.8 || 3.9 || align=center|
|-
|align="left"| || align="center"|G/F || align="left"|Rhode Island || align="center"|4 || align="center"|– || 252 || 5,438 || 1,054 || 491 || 2,788 || 21.6 || 4.2 || 1.9 || 11.1 || align=center|
|-
|align="left"| || align="center"|F || align="left"|Indiana || align="center"|1 || align="center"| || 17 || 290 || 59 || 15 || 128 || 17.1 || 3.5 || 0.9 || 7.5 || align=center|
|-
|align="left"| || align="center"|G/F || align="left"|Averett || align="center"|1 || align="center"| || 15 || 64 || 15 || 8 || 33 || 4.3 || 1.0 || 0.5 || 2.2 || align=center|
|-
|align="left"| || align="center"|G/F || align="left"|Georgetown || align="center"|2 || align="center"|– || 27 || 124 || 10 || 8 || 16 || 4.6 || 0.4 || 0.3 || 0.6 || align=center|
|-
|align="left"| || align="center"|F || align="left"|Friendship JC || align="center"|4 || align="center"|– || 212 || 2,814 || 745 || 128 || 1,023 || 13.3 || 3.5 || 0.6 || 4.8 || align=center|
|-
|align="left"| || align="center"|F || align="left"|Northeast Mississippi CC || align="center"|1 || align="center"| || 49 || 1,013 || 190 || 47 || 329 || 20.7 || 3.9 || 1.0 || 6.7 || align=center|
|-
|align="left"| || align="center"|G/F || align="left"|Indiana || align="center"|1 || align="center"| || 81 || 949 || 97 || 75 || 380 || 11.7 || 1.2 || 0.9 || 4.7 || align=center|
|-
|align="left"| || align="center"|F || align="left"|St. John's || align="center"|1 || align="center"| || 29 || 388 || 59 || 17 || 139 || 13.4 || 2.0 || 0.6 || 4.8 || align=center|
|-
|align="left"| || align="center"|F || align="left"|UCLA || align="center"|1 || align="center"| || 14 || 138 || 53 || 1 || 52 || 9.9 || 3.8 || 0.1 || 3.7 || align=center|
|-
|align="left" bgcolor="#FFCC00"|+ || align="center"|G/F || align="left"|St. John's || align="center"|3 || align="center"|– || 161 || 2,835 || 497 || 347 || 2,110 || 29.8 || 3.1 || 2.2 || 13.1 || align=center|
|}

References

External links
New York Knicks all-time roster

National Basketball Association all-time rosters
New York Knicks players
roster